

588001–588100 

|-bgcolor=#fefefe
| 588001 ||  || — || March 11, 2007 || Kitt Peak || Spacewatch ||  || align=right data-sort-value="0.55" | 550 m || 
|-id=002 bgcolor=#d6d6d6
| 588002 ||  || — || March 11, 2007 || Kitt Peak || Spacewatch ||  || align=right | 3.3 km || 
|-id=003 bgcolor=#E9E9E9
| 588003 ||  || — || March 11, 2007 || Kitt Peak || Spacewatch ||  || align=right | 1.0 km || 
|-id=004 bgcolor=#E9E9E9
| 588004 ||  || — || March 11, 2007 || Kitt Peak || Spacewatch ||  || align=right | 1.2 km || 
|-id=005 bgcolor=#fefefe
| 588005 ||  || — || March 11, 2007 || Kitt Peak || Spacewatch ||  || align=right data-sort-value="0.62" | 620 m || 
|-id=006 bgcolor=#E9E9E9
| 588006 ||  || — || March 12, 2007 || Mount Lemmon || Mount Lemmon Survey ||  || align=right | 1.3 km || 
|-id=007 bgcolor=#E9E9E9
| 588007 ||  || — || March 14, 2007 || Mount Lemmon || Mount Lemmon Survey ||  || align=right data-sort-value="0.74" | 740 m || 
|-id=008 bgcolor=#E9E9E9
| 588008 ||  || — || November 1, 2000 || Kitt Peak || Spacewatch ||  || align=right | 1.5 km || 
|-id=009 bgcolor=#d6d6d6
| 588009 ||  || — || January 27, 2007 || Mount Lemmon || Mount Lemmon Survey ||  || align=right | 2.7 km || 
|-id=010 bgcolor=#d6d6d6
| 588010 ||  || — || March 9, 2007 || Kitt Peak || Spacewatch ||  || align=right | 2.8 km || 
|-id=011 bgcolor=#fefefe
| 588011 ||  || — || February 7, 2007 || Kitt Peak || Spacewatch ||  || align=right data-sort-value="0.48" | 480 m || 
|-id=012 bgcolor=#E9E9E9
| 588012 ||  || — || March 12, 2007 || Kitt Peak || Spacewatch ||  || align=right | 1.7 km || 
|-id=013 bgcolor=#d6d6d6
| 588013 ||  || — || March 12, 2007 || Mount Lemmon || Mount Lemmon Survey ||  || align=right | 2.9 km || 
|-id=014 bgcolor=#d6d6d6
| 588014 ||  || — || September 17, 2003 || Kitt Peak || Spacewatch ||  || align=right | 3.7 km || 
|-id=015 bgcolor=#E9E9E9
| 588015 ||  || — || March 7, 2003 || Needville || J. Dellinger, W. G. Dillon ||  || align=right | 1.0 km || 
|-id=016 bgcolor=#d6d6d6
| 588016 ||  || — || February 23, 2007 || Mount Lemmon || Mount Lemmon Survey || THM || align=right | 2.3 km || 
|-id=017 bgcolor=#d6d6d6
| 588017 ||  || — || March 14, 2007 || Kitt Peak || Spacewatch ||  || align=right | 2.9 km || 
|-id=018 bgcolor=#d6d6d6
| 588018 ||  || — || March 15, 2007 || Kitt Peak || Spacewatch ||  || align=right | 2.2 km || 
|-id=019 bgcolor=#d6d6d6
| 588019 ||  || — || March 12, 2007 || Mount Lemmon || Mount Lemmon Survey ||  || align=right | 2.2 km || 
|-id=020 bgcolor=#d6d6d6
| 588020 ||  || — || March 12, 2007 || Mount Lemmon || Mount Lemmon Survey ||  || align=right | 2.1 km || 
|-id=021 bgcolor=#d6d6d6
| 588021 ||  || — || March 13, 2007 || Mount Lemmon || Mount Lemmon Survey ||  || align=right | 2.3 km || 
|-id=022 bgcolor=#fefefe
| 588022 ||  || — || March 14, 2007 || Kitt Peak || Spacewatch ||  || align=right data-sort-value="0.49" | 490 m || 
|-id=023 bgcolor=#d6d6d6
| 588023 ||  || — || January 25, 2007 || Kitt Peak || Spacewatch ||  || align=right | 2.3 km || 
|-id=024 bgcolor=#fefefe
| 588024 ||  || — || March 13, 2007 || Kitt Peak || Spacewatch ||  || align=right data-sort-value="0.43" | 430 m || 
|-id=025 bgcolor=#E9E9E9
| 588025 ||  || — || March 15, 2007 || Mount Lemmon || Mount Lemmon Survey ||  || align=right | 1.4 km || 
|-id=026 bgcolor=#d6d6d6
| 588026 ||  || — || January 31, 2012 || Kitt Peak || Spacewatch ||  || align=right | 2.7 km || 
|-id=027 bgcolor=#d6d6d6
| 588027 ||  || — || November 2, 2010 || Mount Lemmon || Mount Lemmon Survey ||  || align=right | 2.9 km || 
|-id=028 bgcolor=#d6d6d6
| 588028 ||  || — || February 8, 2002 || Palomar || NEAT ||  || align=right | 3.0 km || 
|-id=029 bgcolor=#d6d6d6
| 588029 ||  || — || March 11, 1996 || Kitt Peak || Spacewatch ||  || align=right | 3.0 km || 
|-id=030 bgcolor=#E9E9E9
| 588030 ||  || — || August 31, 2017 || Haleakala || Pan-STARRS ||  || align=right data-sort-value="0.84" | 840 m || 
|-id=031 bgcolor=#E9E9E9
| 588031 ||  || — || December 11, 2013 || Haleakala || Pan-STARRS ||  || align=right | 1.3 km || 
|-id=032 bgcolor=#E9E9E9
| 588032 ||  || — || March 14, 2007 || Mount Lemmon || Mount Lemmon Survey ||  || align=right | 1.2 km || 
|-id=033 bgcolor=#d6d6d6
| 588033 ||  || — || March 14, 2013 || Kitt Peak || Spacewatch ||  || align=right | 2.3 km || 
|-id=034 bgcolor=#E9E9E9
| 588034 ||  || — || February 16, 2015 || Haleakala || Pan-STARRS ||  || align=right | 1.1 km || 
|-id=035 bgcolor=#d6d6d6
| 588035 ||  || — || January 4, 2012 || Mount Lemmon || Mount Lemmon Survey ||  || align=right | 2.6 km || 
|-id=036 bgcolor=#d6d6d6
| 588036 ||  || — || January 26, 2012 || Mount Lemmon || Mount Lemmon Survey ||  || align=right | 2.2 km || 
|-id=037 bgcolor=#d6d6d6
| 588037 ||  || — || March 12, 2007 || Catalina || CSS ||  || align=right | 3.8 km || 
|-id=038 bgcolor=#E9E9E9
| 588038 ||  || — || March 9, 2007 || Kitt Peak || Spacewatch ||  || align=right | 1.3 km || 
|-id=039 bgcolor=#d6d6d6
| 588039 ||  || — || March 13, 2007 || Kitt Peak || Spacewatch ||  || align=right | 3.0 km || 
|-id=040 bgcolor=#E9E9E9
| 588040 ||  || — || March 10, 2007 || Mount Lemmon || Mount Lemmon Survey ||  || align=right | 1.0 km || 
|-id=041 bgcolor=#d6d6d6
| 588041 ||  || — || March 16, 2007 || Kitt Peak || Spacewatch ||  || align=right | 2.6 km || 
|-id=042 bgcolor=#E9E9E9
| 588042 ||  || — || March 16, 2007 || Kitt Peak || Spacewatch ||  || align=right | 1.4 km || 
|-id=043 bgcolor=#E9E9E9
| 588043 ||  || — || March 16, 2007 || Kitt Peak || Spacewatch ||  || align=right | 1.1 km || 
|-id=044 bgcolor=#d6d6d6
| 588044 ||  || — || March 19, 2007 || Mount Lemmon || Mount Lemmon Survey ||  || align=right | 2.9 km || 
|-id=045 bgcolor=#d6d6d6
| 588045 ||  || — || February 21, 2007 || Mount Lemmon || Mount Lemmon Survey ||  || align=right | 1.9 km || 
|-id=046 bgcolor=#E9E9E9
| 588046 ||  || — || March 9, 2007 || Mount Lemmon || Mount Lemmon Survey ||  || align=right data-sort-value="0.60" | 600 m || 
|-id=047 bgcolor=#E9E9E9
| 588047 ||  || — || March 20, 2007 || Mount Lemmon || Mount Lemmon Survey ||  || align=right data-sort-value="0.78" | 780 m || 
|-id=048 bgcolor=#fefefe
| 588048 ||  || — || March 10, 2007 || Mount Lemmon || Mount Lemmon Survey ||  || align=right data-sort-value="0.58" | 580 m || 
|-id=049 bgcolor=#E9E9E9
| 588049 ||  || — || March 26, 2007 || Mount Lemmon || Mount Lemmon Survey ||  || align=right | 1.2 km || 
|-id=050 bgcolor=#E9E9E9
| 588050 ||  || — || March 16, 2007 || Crni Vrh || B. Dintinjana ||  || align=right | 1.6 km || 
|-id=051 bgcolor=#d6d6d6
| 588051 ||  || — || March 26, 2007 || Kitt Peak || Spacewatch ||  || align=right | 2.9 km || 
|-id=052 bgcolor=#E9E9E9
| 588052 ||  || — || March 16, 2007 || Mount Lemmon || Mount Lemmon Survey ||  || align=right | 1.3 km || 
|-id=053 bgcolor=#d6d6d6
| 588053 ||  || — || January 21, 2012 || Catalina || CSS ||  || align=right | 3.3 km || 
|-id=054 bgcolor=#d6d6d6
| 588054 ||  || — || March 17, 2007 || Anderson Mesa || LONEOS ||  || align=right | 3.7 km || 
|-id=055 bgcolor=#E9E9E9
| 588055 ||  || — || March 25, 2007 || Mount Lemmon || Mount Lemmon Survey ||  || align=right | 1.7 km || 
|-id=056 bgcolor=#E9E9E9
| 588056 ||  || — || February 10, 2015 || Kitt Peak || Spacewatch ||  || align=right | 1.2 km || 
|-id=057 bgcolor=#d6d6d6
| 588057 ||  || — || September 16, 2009 || Mount Lemmon || Mount Lemmon Survey ||  || align=right | 2.5 km || 
|-id=058 bgcolor=#fefefe
| 588058 ||  || — || March 26, 2007 || Mount Lemmon || Mount Lemmon Survey || H || align=right data-sort-value="0.49" | 490 m || 
|-id=059 bgcolor=#E9E9E9
| 588059 ||  || — || February 6, 2007 || Kitt Peak || Spacewatch ||  || align=right data-sort-value="0.76" | 760 m || 
|-id=060 bgcolor=#d6d6d6
| 588060 ||  || — || September 11, 2015 || Haleakala || Pan-STARRS ||  || align=right | 2.2 km || 
|-id=061 bgcolor=#fefefe
| 588061 ||  || — || March 16, 2007 || Kitt Peak || Spacewatch ||  || align=right data-sort-value="0.47" | 470 m || 
|-id=062 bgcolor=#fefefe
| 588062 ||  || — || March 16, 2007 || Mount Lemmon || Mount Lemmon Survey ||  || align=right data-sort-value="0.62" | 620 m || 
|-id=063 bgcolor=#E9E9E9
| 588063 ||  || — || March 20, 2007 || Mount Lemmon || Mount Lemmon Survey ||  || align=right | 1.1 km || 
|-id=064 bgcolor=#d6d6d6
| 588064 ||  || — || April 8, 2007 || Bergisch Gladbach || W. Bickel ||  || align=right | 2.4 km || 
|-id=065 bgcolor=#fefefe
| 588065 ||  || — || April 11, 2007 || Kitt Peak || Spacewatch ||  || align=right data-sort-value="0.66" | 660 m || 
|-id=066 bgcolor=#fefefe
| 588066 ||  || — || March 11, 2007 || Kitt Peak || Spacewatch ||  || align=right data-sort-value="0.60" | 600 m || 
|-id=067 bgcolor=#fefefe
| 588067 ||  || — || March 11, 2007 || Kitt Peak || Spacewatch ||  || align=right data-sort-value="0.56" | 560 m || 
|-id=068 bgcolor=#fefefe
| 588068 ||  || — || April 14, 2007 || Kitt Peak || Spacewatch ||  || align=right data-sort-value="0.55" | 550 m || 
|-id=069 bgcolor=#d6d6d6
| 588069 ||  || — || March 15, 2007 || Mount Lemmon || Mount Lemmon Survey ||  || align=right | 2.4 km || 
|-id=070 bgcolor=#fefefe
| 588070 ||  || — || April 15, 2007 || Mount Lemmon || Mount Lemmon Survey || H || align=right data-sort-value="0.52" | 520 m || 
|-id=071 bgcolor=#E9E9E9
| 588071 ||  || — || April 15, 2007 || Kitt Peak || Spacewatch ||  || align=right | 1.3 km || 
|-id=072 bgcolor=#E9E9E9
| 588072 ||  || — || March 11, 2007 || Kitt Peak || Spacewatch ||  || align=right | 1.2 km || 
|-id=073 bgcolor=#d6d6d6
| 588073 ||  || — || March 26, 2007 || Mount Lemmon || Mount Lemmon Survey ||  || align=right | 2.4 km || 
|-id=074 bgcolor=#d6d6d6
| 588074 ||  || — || April 11, 2007 || Mauna Kea || Mauna Kea Obs. ||  || align=right | 3.2 km || 
|-id=075 bgcolor=#fefefe
| 588075 ||  || — || April 15, 2007 || Kitt Peak || Spacewatch || H || align=right data-sort-value="0.65" | 650 m || 
|-id=076 bgcolor=#d6d6d6
| 588076 ||  || — || October 17, 2010 || Mount Lemmon || Mount Lemmon Survey ||  || align=right | 2.8 km || 
|-id=077 bgcolor=#E9E9E9
| 588077 ||  || — || November 2, 2013 || Kitt Peak || Spacewatch ||  || align=right | 1.3 km || 
|-id=078 bgcolor=#fefefe
| 588078 ||  || — || April 15, 2007 || Kitt Peak || Spacewatch ||  || align=right data-sort-value="0.65" | 650 m || 
|-id=079 bgcolor=#E9E9E9
| 588079 ||  || — || April 14, 2007 || Kitt Peak || Spacewatch ||  || align=right | 1.2 km || 
|-id=080 bgcolor=#fefefe
| 588080 ||  || — || April 15, 2007 || Kitt Peak || Spacewatch ||  || align=right data-sort-value="0.66" | 660 m || 
|-id=081 bgcolor=#E9E9E9
| 588081 ||  || — || April 15, 2007 || Kitt Peak || Spacewatch ||  || align=right data-sort-value="0.87" | 870 m || 
|-id=082 bgcolor=#d6d6d6
| 588082 ||  || — || April 18, 2007 || Mount Lemmon || Mount Lemmon Survey ||  || align=right | 2.1 km || 
|-id=083 bgcolor=#C2FFFF
| 588083 ||  || — || March 15, 2007 || Kitt Peak || Spacewatch || L5 || align=right | 7.3 km || 
|-id=084 bgcolor=#E9E9E9
| 588084 ||  || — || April 18, 2007 || Mount Lemmon || Mount Lemmon Survey ||  || align=right | 1.1 km || 
|-id=085 bgcolor=#d6d6d6
| 588085 ||  || — || April 16, 2007 || Mount Lemmon || Mount Lemmon Survey || Tj (2.94) || align=right | 2.6 km || 
|-id=086 bgcolor=#E9E9E9
| 588086 ||  || — || April 18, 2007 || Kitt Peak || Spacewatch ||  || align=right data-sort-value="0.72" | 720 m || 
|-id=087 bgcolor=#d6d6d6
| 588087 ||  || — || September 12, 2004 || Kitt Peak || Spacewatch ||  || align=right | 3.0 km || 
|-id=088 bgcolor=#fefefe
| 588088 ||  || — || March 15, 2007 || Mount Lemmon || Mount Lemmon Survey ||  || align=right data-sort-value="0.60" | 600 m || 
|-id=089 bgcolor=#E9E9E9
| 588089 ||  || — || April 22, 2007 || Kitt Peak || Spacewatch ||  || align=right | 1.7 km || 
|-id=090 bgcolor=#E9E9E9
| 588090 ||  || — || April 22, 2007 || Mount Lemmon || Mount Lemmon Survey ||  || align=right | 1.6 km || 
|-id=091 bgcolor=#E9E9E9
| 588091 ||  || — || April 22, 2007 || Mount Lemmon || Mount Lemmon Survey ||  || align=right | 2.0 km || 
|-id=092 bgcolor=#fefefe
| 588092 ||  || — || April 23, 2007 || Kitt Peak || Spacewatch ||  || align=right data-sort-value="0.64" | 640 m || 
|-id=093 bgcolor=#d6d6d6
| 588093 ||  || — || April 23, 2007 || Catalina || CSS ||  || align=right | 3.7 km || 
|-id=094 bgcolor=#E9E9E9
| 588094 ||  || — || April 25, 2007 || Kitt Peak || Spacewatch ||  || align=right | 1.4 km || 
|-id=095 bgcolor=#E9E9E9
| 588095 ||  || — || April 22, 2007 || Kitt Peak || Spacewatch ||  || align=right | 1.1 km || 
|-id=096 bgcolor=#E9E9E9
| 588096 ||  || — || April 18, 2007 || Mount Lemmon || Mount Lemmon Survey ||  || align=right | 1.2 km || 
|-id=097 bgcolor=#E9E9E9
| 588097 ||  || — || April 22, 2007 || Catalina || CSS || JUN || align=right | 1.1 km || 
|-id=098 bgcolor=#d6d6d6
| 588098 ||  || — || April 25, 2007 || Mount Lemmon || Mount Lemmon Survey ||  || align=right | 2.7 km || 
|-id=099 bgcolor=#d6d6d6
| 588099 ||  || — || April 23, 2007 || Mount Lemmon || Mount Lemmon Survey ||  || align=right | 2.6 km || 
|-id=100 bgcolor=#d6d6d6
| 588100 ||  || — || April 13, 2013 || Kitt Peak || Spacewatch ||  || align=right | 2.6 km || 
|}

588101–588200 

|-bgcolor=#E9E9E9
| 588101 ||  || — || September 22, 2017 || Haleakala || Pan-STARRS ||  || align=right data-sort-value="0.85" | 850 m || 
|-id=102 bgcolor=#E9E9E9
| 588102 ||  || — || April 22, 2007 || Kitt Peak || Spacewatch ||  || align=right | 1.3 km || 
|-id=103 bgcolor=#d6d6d6
| 588103 ||  || — || March 4, 2017 || Haleakala || Pan-STARRS ||  || align=right | 2.0 km || 
|-id=104 bgcolor=#d6d6d6
| 588104 ||  || — || April 25, 2007 || Kitt Peak || Spacewatch ||  || align=right | 2.3 km || 
|-id=105 bgcolor=#E9E9E9
| 588105 ||  || — || April 18, 2007 || Kitt Peak || Spacewatch ||  || align=right | 1.2 km || 
|-id=106 bgcolor=#fefefe
| 588106 ||  || — || April 22, 2007 || Mount Lemmon || Mount Lemmon Survey ||  || align=right data-sort-value="0.60" | 600 m || 
|-id=107 bgcolor=#E9E9E9
| 588107 ||  || — || April 26, 2007 || Kitt Peak || Spacewatch ||  || align=right | 1.4 km || 
|-id=108 bgcolor=#d6d6d6
| 588108 ||  || — || May 8, 2007 || Nogales || J.-C. Merlin ||  || align=right | 3.3 km || 
|-id=109 bgcolor=#E9E9E9
| 588109 ||  || — || April 22, 2007 || Mount Lemmon || Mount Lemmon Survey ||  || align=right | 1.9 km || 
|-id=110 bgcolor=#E9E9E9
| 588110 ||  || — || March 18, 2007 || Kitt Peak || Spacewatch ||  || align=right | 1.3 km || 
|-id=111 bgcolor=#E9E9E9
| 588111 ||  || — || May 9, 2007 || Mount Lemmon || Mount Lemmon Survey ||  || align=right | 1.2 km || 
|-id=112 bgcolor=#E9E9E9
| 588112 ||  || — || May 7, 2007 || Lulin || LUSS ||  || align=right | 1.8 km || 
|-id=113 bgcolor=#E9E9E9
| 588113 ||  || — || May 10, 2007 || Kitt Peak || Spacewatch ||  || align=right | 1.2 km || 
|-id=114 bgcolor=#fefefe
| 588114 ||  || — || September 20, 2011 || Kitt Peak || Spacewatch ||  || align=right data-sort-value="0.64" | 640 m || 
|-id=115 bgcolor=#fefefe
| 588115 ||  || — || May 13, 2007 || Kitt Peak || Spacewatch || H || align=right data-sort-value="0.53" | 530 m || 
|-id=116 bgcolor=#d6d6d6
| 588116 ||  || — || August 22, 2014 || Haleakala || Pan-STARRS ||  || align=right | 2.3 km || 
|-id=117 bgcolor=#E9E9E9
| 588117 ||  || — || November 27, 2009 || Mount Lemmon || Mount Lemmon Survey ||  || align=right data-sort-value="0.75" | 750 m || 
|-id=118 bgcolor=#fefefe
| 588118 ||  || — || May 13, 2007 || Kitt Peak || Spacewatch ||  || align=right data-sort-value="0.50" | 500 m || 
|-id=119 bgcolor=#E9E9E9
| 588119 ||  || — || May 16, 2007 || Mount Lemmon || Mount Lemmon Survey ||  || align=right | 1.7 km || 
|-id=120 bgcolor=#E9E9E9
| 588120 ||  || — || May 25, 2007 || Mount Lemmon || Mount Lemmon Survey ||  || align=right | 1.7 km || 
|-id=121 bgcolor=#d6d6d6
| 588121 ||  || — || September 21, 2003 || Kitt Peak || Spacewatch ||  || align=right | 3.1 km || 
|-id=122 bgcolor=#E9E9E9
| 588122 ||  || — || May 13, 2007 || Kitt Peak || Spacewatch ||  || align=right | 1.6 km || 
|-id=123 bgcolor=#E9E9E9
| 588123 ||  || — || June 13, 2007 || Kitt Peak || Spacewatch ||  || align=right | 1.7 km || 
|-id=124 bgcolor=#E9E9E9
| 588124 ||  || — || June 14, 2007 || Kitt Peak || Spacewatch ||  || align=right | 1.6 km || 
|-id=125 bgcolor=#fefefe
| 588125 ||  || — || February 21, 2013 || Haleakala || Pan-STARRS ||  || align=right data-sort-value="0.75" | 750 m || 
|-id=126 bgcolor=#E9E9E9
| 588126 ||  || — || April 24, 2007 || Mount Lemmon || Mount Lemmon Survey ||  || align=right | 1.3 km || 
|-id=127 bgcolor=#E9E9E9
| 588127 ||  || — || May 25, 2007 || Mount Lemmon || Mount Lemmon Survey ||  || align=right | 1.5 km || 
|-id=128 bgcolor=#E9E9E9
| 588128 ||  || — || May 25, 2007 || Mount Lemmon || Mount Lemmon Survey ||  || align=right | 1.3 km || 
|-id=129 bgcolor=#E9E9E9
| 588129 ||  || — || May 18, 2007 || Kitt Peak || Spacewatch || JUN || align=right data-sort-value="0.77" | 770 m || 
|-id=130 bgcolor=#fefefe
| 588130 ||  || — || June 21, 2007 || Mount Lemmon || Mount Lemmon Survey ||  || align=right data-sort-value="0.58" | 580 m || 
|-id=131 bgcolor=#fefefe
| 588131 ||  || — || June 22, 2007 || Kitt Peak || Spacewatch ||  || align=right data-sort-value="0.73" | 730 m || 
|-id=132 bgcolor=#E9E9E9
| 588132 ||  || — || February 19, 2015 || Haleakala || Pan-STARRS ||  || align=right | 1.4 km || 
|-id=133 bgcolor=#E9E9E9
| 588133 ||  || — || August 11, 2012 || Siding Spring || SSS ||  || align=right | 1.6 km || 
|-id=134 bgcolor=#fefefe
| 588134 ||  || — || January 4, 2013 || Kitt Peak || Spacewatch ||  || align=right data-sort-value="0.54" | 540 m || 
|-id=135 bgcolor=#E9E9E9
| 588135 ||  || — || September 5, 2008 || Kitt Peak || Spacewatch ||  || align=right | 1.2 km || 
|-id=136 bgcolor=#C2FFFF
| 588136 ||  || — || December 24, 2011 || Mount Lemmon || Mount Lemmon Survey || L4 || align=right | 8.7 km || 
|-id=137 bgcolor=#E9E9E9
| 588137 ||  || — || August 3, 2007 || La Silla || La Silla Obs. ||  || align=right | 2.0 km || 
|-id=138 bgcolor=#E9E9E9
| 588138 ||  || — || August 9, 2007 || Kitt Peak || Spacewatch ||  || align=right | 1.6 km || 
|-id=139 bgcolor=#fefefe
| 588139 ||  || — || August 9, 2007 || Kitt Peak || Spacewatch ||  || align=right data-sort-value="0.72" | 720 m || 
|-id=140 bgcolor=#E9E9E9
| 588140 ||  || — || August 13, 2007 || Siding Spring || SSS ||  || align=right | 2.2 km || 
|-id=141 bgcolor=#fefefe
| 588141 ||  || — || August 8, 2007 || Siding Spring || SSS || H || align=right data-sort-value="0.59" | 590 m || 
|-id=142 bgcolor=#E9E9E9
| 588142 ||  || — || March 4, 2005 || Mount Lemmon || Mount Lemmon Survey ||  || align=right | 2.2 km || 
|-id=143 bgcolor=#E9E9E9
| 588143 ||  || — || May 30, 2002 || Palomar || NEAT ||  || align=right | 1.9 km || 
|-id=144 bgcolor=#E9E9E9
| 588144 ||  || — || August 23, 2007 || Kitt Peak || Spacewatch ||  || align=right | 1.5 km || 
|-id=145 bgcolor=#E9E9E9
| 588145 ||  || — || September 8, 2007 || Eskridge || G. Hug || AGN || align=right | 1.0 km || 
|-id=146 bgcolor=#E9E9E9
| 588146 ||  || — || September 12, 2007 || Dauban || F. Kugel ||  || align=right | 2.1 km || 
|-id=147 bgcolor=#fefefe
| 588147 ||  || — || September 4, 2007 || Catalina || CSS ||  || align=right data-sort-value="0.81" | 810 m || 
|-id=148 bgcolor=#E9E9E9
| 588148 ||  || — || September 5, 2007 || Mount Lemmon || Mount Lemmon Survey ||  || align=right | 2.0 km || 
|-id=149 bgcolor=#fefefe
| 588149 ||  || — || September 9, 2007 || Kitt Peak || Spacewatch || H || align=right data-sort-value="0.61" | 610 m || 
|-id=150 bgcolor=#fefefe
| 588150 ||  || — || September 9, 2007 || Kitt Peak || Spacewatch ||  || align=right data-sort-value="0.64" | 640 m || 
|-id=151 bgcolor=#E9E9E9
| 588151 ||  || — || February 7, 2006 || Kitt Peak || Spacewatch ||  || align=right | 2.0 km || 
|-id=152 bgcolor=#E9E9E9
| 588152 ||  || — || September 10, 2007 || Kitt Peak || Spacewatch ||  || align=right | 1.6 km || 
|-id=153 bgcolor=#fefefe
| 588153 ||  || — || September 10, 2007 || Kitt Peak || Spacewatch ||  || align=right data-sort-value="0.73" | 730 m || 
|-id=154 bgcolor=#fefefe
| 588154 ||  || — || September 10, 2007 || Mount Lemmon || Mount Lemmon Survey ||  || align=right data-sort-value="0.71" | 710 m || 
|-id=155 bgcolor=#E9E9E9
| 588155 ||  || — || September 11, 2007 || Kitt Peak || Spacewatch ||  || align=right | 1.9 km || 
|-id=156 bgcolor=#fefefe
| 588156 ||  || — || September 11, 2007 || Kitt Peak || Spacewatch || (2076) || align=right data-sort-value="0.63" | 630 m || 
|-id=157 bgcolor=#E9E9E9
| 588157 ||  || — || September 11, 2007 || Mount Lemmon || Mount Lemmon Survey ||  || align=right | 2.0 km || 
|-id=158 bgcolor=#E9E9E9
| 588158 ||  || — || October 25, 2003 || Kitt Peak || Spacewatch ||  || align=right | 1.4 km || 
|-id=159 bgcolor=#E9E9E9
| 588159 ||  || — || August 24, 2007 || Kitt Peak || Spacewatch ||  || align=right | 2.0 km || 
|-id=160 bgcolor=#C2FFFF
| 588160 ||  || — || September 12, 2007 || Mount Lemmon || Mount Lemmon Survey || L4 || align=right | 7.5 km || 
|-id=161 bgcolor=#E9E9E9
| 588161 ||  || — || September 12, 2007 || Mount Lemmon || Mount Lemmon Survey ||  || align=right | 1.1 km || 
|-id=162 bgcolor=#fefefe
| 588162 ||  || — || September 10, 2007 || Kitt Peak || Spacewatch ||  || align=right data-sort-value="0.83" | 830 m || 
|-id=163 bgcolor=#E9E9E9
| 588163 ||  || — || September 10, 2007 || Kitt Peak || Spacewatch ||  || align=right | 2.0 km || 
|-id=164 bgcolor=#E9E9E9
| 588164 ||  || — || September 10, 2007 || Kitt Peak || Spacewatch ||  || align=right | 1.7 km || 
|-id=165 bgcolor=#fefefe
| 588165 ||  || — || September 10, 2007 || Mount Lemmon || Mount Lemmon Survey ||  || align=right data-sort-value="0.65" | 650 m || 
|-id=166 bgcolor=#fefefe
| 588166 ||  || — || September 10, 2007 || Kitt Peak || Spacewatch ||  || align=right data-sort-value="0.62" | 620 m || 
|-id=167 bgcolor=#fefefe
| 588167 ||  || — || September 13, 2007 || Mount Lemmon || Mount Lemmon Survey ||  || align=right data-sort-value="0.74" | 740 m || 
|-id=168 bgcolor=#E9E9E9
| 588168 ||  || — || October 19, 2003 || Kitt Peak || Spacewatch ||  || align=right data-sort-value="0.78" | 780 m || 
|-id=169 bgcolor=#d6d6d6
| 588169 ||  || — || September 11, 2007 || Kitt Peak || Spacewatch ||  || align=right | 1.8 km || 
|-id=170 bgcolor=#d6d6d6
| 588170 ||  || — || September 11, 2007 || Kitt Peak || Spacewatch ||  || align=right | 1.7 km || 
|-id=171 bgcolor=#E9E9E9
| 588171 ||  || — || September 12, 2007 || Kitt Peak || Spacewatch ||  || align=right data-sort-value="0.79" | 790 m || 
|-id=172 bgcolor=#E9E9E9
| 588172 ||  || — || September 10, 2007 || Kitt Peak || Spacewatch ||  || align=right | 2.1 km || 
|-id=173 bgcolor=#fefefe
| 588173 ||  || — || September 14, 2007 || Mount Lemmon || Mount Lemmon Survey ||  || align=right data-sort-value="0.55" | 550 m || 
|-id=174 bgcolor=#E9E9E9
| 588174 ||  || — || February 25, 2006 || Mount Lemmon || Mount Lemmon Survey ||  || align=right | 1.3 km || 
|-id=175 bgcolor=#d6d6d6
| 588175 ||  || — || July 18, 2007 || Mount Lemmon || Mount Lemmon Survey ||  || align=right | 2.1 km || 
|-id=176 bgcolor=#C2FFFF
| 588176 ||  || — || September 15, 2007 || Mount Lemmon || Mount Lemmon Survey || L4 || align=right | 7.2 km || 
|-id=177 bgcolor=#fefefe
| 588177 ||  || — || September 14, 2007 || Anderson Mesa || LONEOS ||  || align=right data-sort-value="0.65" | 650 m || 
|-id=178 bgcolor=#E9E9E9
| 588178 ||  || — || September 15, 2007 || Kitt Peak || Spacewatch ||  || align=right | 2.4 km || 
|-id=179 bgcolor=#fefefe
| 588179 ||  || — || September 9, 2007 || Kitt Peak || Spacewatch ||  || align=right data-sort-value="0.50" | 500 m || 
|-id=180 bgcolor=#E9E9E9
| 588180 ||  || — || September 14, 2007 || Catalina || CSS ||  || align=right | 2.2 km || 
|-id=181 bgcolor=#fefefe
| 588181 ||  || — || September 12, 2007 || Anderson Mesa || LONEOS ||  || align=right data-sort-value="0.68" | 680 m || 
|-id=182 bgcolor=#fefefe
| 588182 ||  || — || September 3, 2007 || Catalina || CSS ||  || align=right data-sort-value="0.79" | 790 m || 
|-id=183 bgcolor=#fefefe
| 588183 ||  || — || September 12, 2007 || Mount Lemmon || Mount Lemmon Survey ||  || align=right data-sort-value="0.41" | 410 m || 
|-id=184 bgcolor=#fefefe
| 588184 ||  || — || September 14, 2007 || Kitt Peak || Spacewatch ||  || align=right data-sort-value="0.70" | 700 m || 
|-id=185 bgcolor=#E9E9E9
| 588185 ||  || — || September 14, 2007 || Kitt Peak || Spacewatch ||  || align=right | 2.1 km || 
|-id=186 bgcolor=#E9E9E9
| 588186 ||  || — || September 10, 2007 || Mount Lemmon || Mount Lemmon Survey ||  || align=right | 1.9 km || 
|-id=187 bgcolor=#E9E9E9
| 588187 ||  || — || October 10, 2012 || Haleakala || Pan-STARRS ||  || align=right | 2.1 km || 
|-id=188 bgcolor=#C2FFFF
| 588188 ||  || — || January 10, 2013 || Haleakala || Pan-STARRS || L4 || align=right | 8.5 km || 
|-id=189 bgcolor=#fefefe
| 588189 ||  || — || September 11, 2007 || Kitt Peak || Spacewatch ||  || align=right data-sort-value="0.50" | 500 m || 
|-id=190 bgcolor=#d6d6d6
| 588190 ||  || — || September 14, 2007 || Mount Lemmon || Mount Lemmon Survey ||  || align=right | 1.6 km || 
|-id=191 bgcolor=#E9E9E9
| 588191 ||  || — || September 21, 2012 || Kitt Peak || Spacewatch ||  || align=right | 1.5 km || 
|-id=192 bgcolor=#E9E9E9
| 588192 ||  || — || January 25, 2014 || Haleakala || Pan-STARRS ||  || align=right | 1.8 km || 
|-id=193 bgcolor=#fefefe
| 588193 ||  || — || September 12, 2007 || Mount Lemmon || Mount Lemmon Survey ||  || align=right data-sort-value="0.77" | 770 m || 
|-id=194 bgcolor=#d6d6d6
| 588194 ||  || — || September 12, 2007 || Mount Lemmon || Mount Lemmon Survey ||  || align=right | 1.8 km || 
|-id=195 bgcolor=#E9E9E9
| 588195 ||  || — || September 10, 2007 || Kitt Peak || Spacewatch ||  || align=right | 1.9 km || 
|-id=196 bgcolor=#C2FFFF
| 588196 ||  || — || September 11, 2007 || Mount Lemmon || Mount Lemmon Survey || L4 || align=right | 6.8 km || 
|-id=197 bgcolor=#E9E9E9
| 588197 ||  || — || September 15, 2007 || Lulin || LUSS ||  || align=right | 2.6 km || 
|-id=198 bgcolor=#fefefe
| 588198 ||  || — || September 18, 2007 || Kitt Peak || Spacewatch ||  || align=right data-sort-value="0.52" | 520 m || 
|-id=199 bgcolor=#E9E9E9
| 588199 ||  || — || September 26, 2007 || Mount Lemmon || Mount Lemmon Survey ||  || align=right | 1.6 km || 
|-id=200 bgcolor=#fefefe
| 588200 ||  || — || September 9, 2007 || Kitt Peak || Spacewatch ||  || align=right data-sort-value="0.66" | 660 m || 
|}

588201–588300 

|-bgcolor=#d6d6d6
| 588201 ||  || — || September 18, 2007 || Kitt Peak || Spacewatch ||  || align=right | 1.7 km || 
|-id=202 bgcolor=#C2FFFF
| 588202 ||  || — || March 19, 2001 || Apache Point || SDSS Collaboration || L4 || align=right | 10 km || 
|-id=203 bgcolor=#d6d6d6
| 588203 ||  || — || September 26, 2007 || Mount Lemmon || Mount Lemmon Survey ||  || align=right | 3.0 km || 
|-id=204 bgcolor=#FA8072
| 588204 ||  || — || September 18, 2007 || Mount Lemmon || Mount Lemmon Survey ||  || align=right data-sort-value="0.64" | 640 m || 
|-id=205 bgcolor=#fefefe
| 588205 ||  || — || September 19, 2007 || Kitt Peak || Spacewatch || H || align=right data-sort-value="0.50" | 500 m || 
|-id=206 bgcolor=#fefefe
| 588206 ||  || — || September 19, 2007 || Kitt Peak || Spacewatch ||  || align=right data-sort-value="0.74" | 740 m || 
|-id=207 bgcolor=#d6d6d6
| 588207 ||  || — || September 24, 2007 || Kitt Peak || Spacewatch ||  || align=right | 1.5 km || 
|-id=208 bgcolor=#E9E9E9
| 588208 ||  || — || October 6, 2007 || Dauban || F. Kugel ||  || align=right | 2.1 km || 
|-id=209 bgcolor=#C2FFFF
| 588209 ||  || — || October 6, 2007 || Bergisch Gladbach || W. Bickel || L4 || align=right | 8.3 km || 
|-id=210 bgcolor=#fefefe
| 588210 ||  || — || October 6, 2007 || Charleston || R. Holmes ||  || align=right data-sort-value="0.61" | 610 m || 
|-id=211 bgcolor=#fefefe
| 588211 ||  || — || October 7, 2007 || Kitt Peak || Spacewatch ||  || align=right data-sort-value="0.79" | 790 m || 
|-id=212 bgcolor=#fefefe
| 588212 ||  || — || October 4, 2007 || Kitt Peak || Spacewatch ||  || align=right data-sort-value="0.51" | 510 m || 
|-id=213 bgcolor=#fefefe
| 588213 ||  || — || October 7, 2007 || Mount Lemmon || Mount Lemmon Survey ||  || align=right data-sort-value="0.67" | 670 m || 
|-id=214 bgcolor=#fefefe
| 588214 ||  || — || October 13, 2007 || Bergisch Gladbach || W. Bickel ||  || align=right data-sort-value="0.75" | 750 m || 
|-id=215 bgcolor=#E9E9E9
| 588215 ||  || — || October 8, 2007 || Mount Lemmon || Mount Lemmon Survey ||  || align=right | 1.7 km || 
|-id=216 bgcolor=#E9E9E9
| 588216 ||  || — || November 14, 1998 || Kitt Peak || Spacewatch ||  || align=right | 2.3 km || 
|-id=217 bgcolor=#fefefe
| 588217 ||  || — || October 8, 2007 || Kitt Peak || Spacewatch ||  || align=right data-sort-value="0.70" | 700 m || 
|-id=218 bgcolor=#E9E9E9
| 588218 ||  || — || October 4, 2007 || Kitt Peak || Spacewatch ||  || align=right | 2.5 km || 
|-id=219 bgcolor=#E9E9E9
| 588219 ||  || — || October 12, 2007 || Socorro || LINEAR ||  || align=right | 2.0 km || 
|-id=220 bgcolor=#fefefe
| 588220 ||  || — || October 4, 2007 || Kitt Peak || Spacewatch ||  || align=right data-sort-value="0.69" | 690 m || 
|-id=221 bgcolor=#d6d6d6
| 588221 ||  || — || October 6, 2007 || Kitt Peak || Spacewatch ||  || align=right | 1.8 km || 
|-id=222 bgcolor=#d6d6d6
| 588222 ||  || — || October 7, 2007 || Mount Lemmon || Mount Lemmon Survey ||  || align=right | 2.0 km || 
|-id=223 bgcolor=#fefefe
| 588223 ||  || — || August 24, 2007 || Kitt Peak || Spacewatch ||  || align=right data-sort-value="0.71" | 710 m || 
|-id=224 bgcolor=#E9E9E9
| 588224 ||  || — || April 2, 2005 || Mount Lemmon || Mount Lemmon Survey ||  || align=right | 2.3 km || 
|-id=225 bgcolor=#E9E9E9
| 588225 ||  || — || October 8, 2007 || Kitt Peak || Spacewatch ||  || align=right | 1.7 km || 
|-id=226 bgcolor=#d6d6d6
| 588226 ||  || — || October 11, 2007 || Kitt Peak || Spacewatch ||  || align=right | 2.1 km || 
|-id=227 bgcolor=#fefefe
| 588227 ||  || — || October 8, 2007 || Kitt Peak || Spacewatch ||  || align=right data-sort-value="0.71" | 710 m || 
|-id=228 bgcolor=#E9E9E9
| 588228 ||  || — || October 10, 2007 || Mount Lemmon || Mount Lemmon Survey ||  || align=right | 1.7 km || 
|-id=229 bgcolor=#E9E9E9
| 588229 ||  || — || October 8, 2007 || Catalina || CSS ||  || align=right | 1.7 km || 
|-id=230 bgcolor=#E9E9E9
| 588230 ||  || — || April 6, 2005 || Kitt Peak || Spacewatch ||  || align=right | 2.2 km || 
|-id=231 bgcolor=#E9E9E9
| 588231 ||  || — || October 11, 2007 || Mount Lemmon || Mount Lemmon Survey ||  || align=right | 2.2 km || 
|-id=232 bgcolor=#E9E9E9
| 588232 ||  || — || September 13, 2007 || Mount Lemmon || Mount Lemmon Survey ||  || align=right | 1.9 km || 
|-id=233 bgcolor=#E9E9E9
| 588233 ||  || — || September 14, 2007 || Mount Lemmon || Mount Lemmon Survey ||  || align=right | 1.9 km || 
|-id=234 bgcolor=#fefefe
| 588234 ||  || — || September 14, 2007 || Mount Lemmon || Mount Lemmon Survey ||  || align=right data-sort-value="0.64" | 640 m || 
|-id=235 bgcolor=#E9E9E9
| 588235 ||  || — || October 10, 2007 || Kitt Peak || Spacewatch ||  || align=right | 2.0 km || 
|-id=236 bgcolor=#E9E9E9
| 588236 ||  || — || October 11, 2007 || Kitt Peak || Spacewatch ||  || align=right | 1.4 km || 
|-id=237 bgcolor=#E9E9E9
| 588237 ||  || — || October 9, 2007 || Kitt Peak || Spacewatch ||  || align=right | 2.1 km || 
|-id=238 bgcolor=#fefefe
| 588238 ||  || — || October 9, 2007 || Kitt Peak || Spacewatch ||  || align=right data-sort-value="0.41" | 410 m || 
|-id=239 bgcolor=#E9E9E9
| 588239 ||  || — || October 11, 2007 || Mount Lemmon || Mount Lemmon Survey ||  || align=right | 2.2 km || 
|-id=240 bgcolor=#E9E9E9
| 588240 ||  || — || October 12, 2007 || Mount Lemmon || Mount Lemmon Survey ||  || align=right | 2.1 km || 
|-id=241 bgcolor=#E9E9E9
| 588241 ||  || — || September 14, 2007 || Mount Lemmon || Mount Lemmon Survey ||  || align=right | 1.2 km || 
|-id=242 bgcolor=#d6d6d6
| 588242 ||  || — || October 12, 2007 || Kitt Peak || Spacewatch ||  || align=right | 2.0 km || 
|-id=243 bgcolor=#E9E9E9
| 588243 ||  || — || May 9, 2006 || Mount Lemmon || Mount Lemmon Survey || AGN || align=right | 1.3 km || 
|-id=244 bgcolor=#d6d6d6
| 588244 ||  || — || October 11, 2007 || Mount Lemmon || Mount Lemmon Survey ||  || align=right | 2.1 km || 
|-id=245 bgcolor=#E9E9E9
| 588245 ||  || — || October 12, 2007 || Kitt Peak || Spacewatch ||  || align=right | 2.8 km || 
|-id=246 bgcolor=#d6d6d6
| 588246 ||  || — || October 12, 2007 || Kitt Peak || Spacewatch ||  || align=right | 1.8 km || 
|-id=247 bgcolor=#fefefe
| 588247 ||  || — || October 11, 2007 || Kitt Peak || Spacewatch ||  || align=right data-sort-value="0.77" | 770 m || 
|-id=248 bgcolor=#E9E9E9
| 588248 ||  || — || August 23, 2007 || Kitt Peak || Spacewatch ||  || align=right | 2.0 km || 
|-id=249 bgcolor=#E9E9E9
| 588249 ||  || — || September 11, 2007 || Mount Lemmon || Mount Lemmon Survey ||  || align=right | 2.0 km || 
|-id=250 bgcolor=#d6d6d6
| 588250 ||  || — || October 9, 2007 || Mount Lemmon || Mount Lemmon Survey ||  || align=right | 1.8 km || 
|-id=251 bgcolor=#E9E9E9
| 588251 ||  || — || October 15, 2007 || Mount Lemmon || Mount Lemmon Survey ||  || align=right | 1.8 km || 
|-id=252 bgcolor=#d6d6d6
| 588252 ||  || — || September 13, 2007 || Mount Lemmon || Mount Lemmon Survey ||  || align=right | 2.6 km || 
|-id=253 bgcolor=#fefefe
| 588253 ||  || — || February 12, 2002 || Kitt Peak || Spacewatch ||  || align=right data-sort-value="0.80" | 800 m || 
|-id=254 bgcolor=#fefefe
| 588254 ||  || — || October 15, 2007 || Mount Lemmon || Mount Lemmon Survey ||  || align=right data-sort-value="0.72" | 720 m || 
|-id=255 bgcolor=#fefefe
| 588255 ||  || — || September 21, 2007 || XuYi || PMO NEO ||  || align=right data-sort-value="0.65" | 650 m || 
|-id=256 bgcolor=#E9E9E9
| 588256 ||  || — || October 11, 2007 || Kitt Peak || Spacewatch ||  || align=right | 1.5 km || 
|-id=257 bgcolor=#fefefe
| 588257 ||  || — || October 14, 2007 || Kitt Peak || Spacewatch ||  || align=right data-sort-value="0.62" | 620 m || 
|-id=258 bgcolor=#E9E9E9
| 588258 ||  || — || October 15, 2007 || Kitt Peak || Spacewatch ||  || align=right | 2.0 km || 
|-id=259 bgcolor=#E9E9E9
| 588259 ||  || — || October 13, 2007 || Kitt Peak || Spacewatch ||  || align=right | 1.8 km || 
|-id=260 bgcolor=#E9E9E9
| 588260 ||  || — || October 11, 2007 || Catalina || CSS ||  || align=right | 2.4 km || 
|-id=261 bgcolor=#fefefe
| 588261 ||  || — || October 15, 2007 || Mount Lemmon || Mount Lemmon Survey ||  || align=right data-sort-value="0.68" | 680 m || 
|-id=262 bgcolor=#fefefe
| 588262 ||  || — || October 9, 2007 || Kitt Peak || Spacewatch || V || align=right data-sort-value="0.66" | 660 m || 
|-id=263 bgcolor=#C2FFFF
| 588263 ||  || — || September 24, 2008 || Kitt Peak || Spacewatch || L4 || align=right | 8.3 km || 
|-id=264 bgcolor=#fefefe
| 588264 ||  || — || April 10, 2002 || Socorro || LINEAR ||  || align=right data-sort-value="0.75" | 750 m || 
|-id=265 bgcolor=#E9E9E9
| 588265 ||  || — || October 9, 2007 || Kitt Peak || Spacewatch ||  || align=right | 2.0 km || 
|-id=266 bgcolor=#E9E9E9
| 588266 ||  || — || October 10, 2007 || Kitt Peak || Spacewatch ||  || align=right | 2.1 km || 
|-id=267 bgcolor=#fefefe
| 588267 ||  || — || October 12, 2007 || Kitt Peak || Spacewatch ||  || align=right data-sort-value="0.47" | 470 m || 
|-id=268 bgcolor=#E9E9E9
| 588268 ||  || — || October 10, 2007 || Kitt Peak || Spacewatch ||  || align=right | 1.3 km || 
|-id=269 bgcolor=#fefefe
| 588269 ||  || — || April 15, 2013 || Haleakala || Pan-STARRS ||  || align=right data-sort-value="0.63" | 630 m || 
|-id=270 bgcolor=#d6d6d6
| 588270 ||  || — || February 26, 2014 || Haleakala || Pan-STARRS ||  || align=right | 1.7 km || 
|-id=271 bgcolor=#fefefe
| 588271 ||  || — || January 1, 2012 || Mount Lemmon || Mount Lemmon Survey ||  || align=right data-sort-value="0.70" | 700 m || 
|-id=272 bgcolor=#d6d6d6
| 588272 ||  || — || January 20, 2014 || Mount Lemmon || Mount Lemmon Survey ||  || align=right | 1.7 km || 
|-id=273 bgcolor=#d6d6d6
| 588273 ||  || — || October 12, 2007 || Mount Lemmon || Mount Lemmon Survey ||  || align=right | 2.0 km || 
|-id=274 bgcolor=#d6d6d6
| 588274 ||  || — || April 8, 2010 || Mount Lemmon || Mount Lemmon Survey ||  || align=right | 2.1 km || 
|-id=275 bgcolor=#E9E9E9
| 588275 ||  || — || October 7, 2007 || Mount Lemmon || Mount Lemmon Survey ||  || align=right | 2.2 km || 
|-id=276 bgcolor=#E9E9E9
| 588276 ||  || — || October 15, 2007 || Kitt Peak || Spacewatch ||  || align=right | 1.9 km || 
|-id=277 bgcolor=#d6d6d6
| 588277 ||  || — || December 29, 2008 || Kitt Peak || Spacewatch ||  || align=right | 1.9 km || 
|-id=278 bgcolor=#d6d6d6
| 588278 ||  || — || October 17, 2012 || Mount Lemmon || Mount Lemmon Survey ||  || align=right | 1.6 km || 
|-id=279 bgcolor=#d6d6d6
| 588279 ||  || — || October 7, 2007 || Mount Lemmon || Mount Lemmon Survey ||  || align=right | 1.7 km || 
|-id=280 bgcolor=#d6d6d6
| 588280 ||  || — || October 10, 2007 || Mount Lemmon || Mount Lemmon Survey ||  || align=right | 2.0 km || 
|-id=281 bgcolor=#E9E9E9
| 588281 ||  || — || October 10, 2007 || Mount Lemmon || Mount Lemmon Survey ||  || align=right | 1.9 km || 
|-id=282 bgcolor=#E9E9E9
| 588282 ||  || — || October 9, 2007 || Mount Lemmon || Mount Lemmon Survey ||  || align=right | 1.1 km || 
|-id=283 bgcolor=#fefefe
| 588283 ||  || — || October 12, 2007 || Kitt Peak || Spacewatch ||  || align=right data-sort-value="0.41" | 410 m || 
|-id=284 bgcolor=#d6d6d6
| 588284 ||  || — || October 4, 2007 || Kitt Peak || Spacewatch ||  || align=right | 2.1 km || 
|-id=285 bgcolor=#E9E9E9
| 588285 ||  || — || October 7, 2007 || Mount Lemmon || Mount Lemmon Survey ||  || align=right data-sort-value="0.92" | 920 m || 
|-id=286 bgcolor=#E9E9E9
| 588286 ||  || — || March 24, 2006 || Mount Lemmon || Mount Lemmon Survey ||  || align=right | 1.2 km || 
|-id=287 bgcolor=#E9E9E9
| 588287 ||  || — || October 16, 2007 || Mount Lemmon || Mount Lemmon Survey ||  || align=right | 1.8 km || 
|-id=288 bgcolor=#E9E9E9
| 588288 ||  || — || October 19, 2007 || Catalina || CSS ||  || align=right | 2.1 km || 
|-id=289 bgcolor=#fefefe
| 588289 ||  || — || October 9, 2007 || Kitt Peak || Spacewatch ||  || align=right data-sort-value="0.65" | 650 m || 
|-id=290 bgcolor=#fefefe
| 588290 ||  || — || October 19, 2007 || Lulin || LUSS || H || align=right | 1.00 km || 
|-id=291 bgcolor=#d6d6d6
| 588291 ||  || — || October 30, 2007 || Mount Lemmon || Mount Lemmon Survey ||  || align=right | 1.6 km || 
|-id=292 bgcolor=#E9E9E9
| 588292 ||  || — || October 12, 2007 || Kitt Peak || Spacewatch ||  || align=right | 1.8 km || 
|-id=293 bgcolor=#E9E9E9
| 588293 ||  || — || October 8, 2007 || Kitt Peak || Spacewatch ||  || align=right | 2.1 km || 
|-id=294 bgcolor=#E9E9E9
| 588294 ||  || — || October 20, 2007 || Mount Lemmon || Mount Lemmon Survey ||  || align=right | 1.9 km || 
|-id=295 bgcolor=#fefefe
| 588295 ||  || — || October 17, 2007 || Mount Lemmon || Mount Lemmon Survey ||  || align=right data-sort-value="0.63" | 630 m || 
|-id=296 bgcolor=#d6d6d6
| 588296 ||  || — || October 17, 2012 || Haleakala || Pan-STARRS ||  || align=right | 1.5 km || 
|-id=297 bgcolor=#d6d6d6
| 588297 ||  || — || October 20, 2007 || Mount Lemmon || Mount Lemmon Survey ||  || align=right | 2.0 km || 
|-id=298 bgcolor=#E9E9E9
| 588298 ||  || — || October 24, 2007 || Mount Lemmon || Mount Lemmon Survey ||  || align=right | 2.2 km || 
|-id=299 bgcolor=#E9E9E9
| 588299 ||  || — || December 8, 2012 || Mount Lemmon || Mount Lemmon Survey ||  || align=right | 1.7 km || 
|-id=300 bgcolor=#fefefe
| 588300 ||  || — || October 16, 2007 || Mount Lemmon || Mount Lemmon Survey ||  || align=right data-sort-value="0.60" | 600 m || 
|}

588301–588400 

|-bgcolor=#d6d6d6
| 588301 ||  || — || October 20, 2007 || Mount Lemmon || Mount Lemmon Survey ||  || align=right | 1.9 km || 
|-id=302 bgcolor=#E9E9E9
| 588302 ||  || — || October 21, 2007 || Mount Lemmon || Mount Lemmon Survey ||  || align=right | 1.5 km || 
|-id=303 bgcolor=#E9E9E9
| 588303 ||  || — || October 18, 2007 || Mount Lemmon || Mount Lemmon Survey ||  || align=right | 1.7 km || 
|-id=304 bgcolor=#d6d6d6
| 588304 ||  || — || October 20, 2007 || Mount Lemmon || Mount Lemmon Survey ||  || align=right | 2.0 km || 
|-id=305 bgcolor=#E9E9E9
| 588305 ||  || — || October 9, 2007 || Kitt Peak || Spacewatch ||  || align=right | 1.9 km || 
|-id=306 bgcolor=#E9E9E9
| 588306 ||  || — || May 10, 2005 || Mount Lemmon || Mount Lemmon Survey ||  || align=right | 2.0 km || 
|-id=307 bgcolor=#E9E9E9
| 588307 ||  || — || November 1, 2007 || Kitt Peak || Spacewatch ||  || align=right | 2.0 km || 
|-id=308 bgcolor=#E9E9E9
| 588308 ||  || — || October 12, 2007 || Kitt Peak || Spacewatch ||  || align=right | 2.2 km || 
|-id=309 bgcolor=#d6d6d6
| 588309 ||  || — || October 8, 2007 || Mount Lemmon || Mount Lemmon Survey ||  || align=right | 1.8 km || 
|-id=310 bgcolor=#E9E9E9
| 588310 ||  || — || November 2, 2007 || Kitt Peak || Spacewatch ||  || align=right | 1.8 km || 
|-id=311 bgcolor=#E9E9E9
| 588311 ||  || — || October 8, 2007 || Mount Lemmon || Mount Lemmon Survey ||  || align=right | 1.8 km || 
|-id=312 bgcolor=#E9E9E9
| 588312 ||  || — || October 19, 2007 || Lulin || LUSS ||  || align=right | 2.8 km || 
|-id=313 bgcolor=#fefefe
| 588313 ||  || — || October 8, 2007 || Mount Lemmon || Mount Lemmon Survey ||  || align=right data-sort-value="0.63" | 630 m || 
|-id=314 bgcolor=#fefefe
| 588314 ||  || — || November 3, 2007 || Kitt Peak || Spacewatch ||  || align=right data-sort-value="0.49" | 490 m || 
|-id=315 bgcolor=#fefefe
| 588315 ||  || — || November 3, 2007 || Kitt Peak || Spacewatch ||  || align=right data-sort-value="0.71" | 710 m || 
|-id=316 bgcolor=#fefefe
| 588316 ||  || — || November 3, 2007 || Kitt Peak || Spacewatch ||  || align=right data-sort-value="0.70" | 700 m || 
|-id=317 bgcolor=#fefefe
| 588317 ||  || — || November 1, 2007 || Mount Lemmon || Mount Lemmon Survey ||  || align=right data-sort-value="0.67" | 670 m || 
|-id=318 bgcolor=#d6d6d6
| 588318 ||  || — || November 1, 2007 || Mount Lemmon || Mount Lemmon Survey ||  || align=right | 1.4 km || 
|-id=319 bgcolor=#fefefe
| 588319 ||  || — || August 28, 2003 || Palomar || NEAT ||  || align=right data-sort-value="0.85" | 850 m || 
|-id=320 bgcolor=#d6d6d6
| 588320 ||  || — || November 4, 2007 || Kitt Peak || Spacewatch ||  || align=right | 2.6 km || 
|-id=321 bgcolor=#fefefe
| 588321 ||  || — || March 25, 2006 || Kitt Peak || Spacewatch ||  || align=right data-sort-value="0.63" | 630 m || 
|-id=322 bgcolor=#d6d6d6
| 588322 ||  || — || October 9, 2007 || Kitt Peak || Spacewatch ||  || align=right | 2.2 km || 
|-id=323 bgcolor=#E9E9E9
| 588323 ||  || — || November 5, 2007 || Kitt Peak || Spacewatch ||  || align=right | 1.5 km || 
|-id=324 bgcolor=#d6d6d6
| 588324 ||  || — || November 5, 2007 || Kitt Peak || Spacewatch ||  || align=right | 2.2 km || 
|-id=325 bgcolor=#fefefe
| 588325 ||  || — || November 3, 2007 || Mount Lemmon || Mount Lemmon Survey || H || align=right data-sort-value="0.65" | 650 m || 
|-id=326 bgcolor=#E9E9E9
| 588326 ||  || — || October 6, 2007 || Kitt Peak || Spacewatch || critical || align=right data-sort-value="0.99" | 990 m || 
|-id=327 bgcolor=#fefefe
| 588327 ||  || — || November 13, 2007 || Catalina || CSS || H || align=right data-sort-value="0.64" | 640 m || 
|-id=328 bgcolor=#E9E9E9
| 588328 ||  || — || November 8, 2007 || Kitt Peak || Spacewatch ||  || align=right | 1.4 km || 
|-id=329 bgcolor=#fefefe
| 588329 ||  || — || November 7, 2007 || Kitt Peak || Spacewatch ||  || align=right data-sort-value="0.80" | 800 m || 
|-id=330 bgcolor=#E9E9E9
| 588330 ||  || — || July 14, 1997 || Kitt Peak || Spacewatch ||  || align=right | 2.4 km || 
|-id=331 bgcolor=#E9E9E9
| 588331 ||  || — || October 20, 2007 || Mount Lemmon || Mount Lemmon Survey ||  || align=right | 2.9 km || 
|-id=332 bgcolor=#fefefe
| 588332 ||  || — || November 2, 2007 || Mount Lemmon || Mount Lemmon Survey ||  || align=right data-sort-value="0.63" | 630 m || 
|-id=333 bgcolor=#E9E9E9
| 588333 ||  || — || November 1, 2007 || Kitt Peak || Spacewatch ||  || align=right | 1.3 km || 
|-id=334 bgcolor=#d6d6d6
| 588334 ||  || — || November 3, 2007 || Kitt Peak || Spacewatch ||  || align=right | 1.7 km || 
|-id=335 bgcolor=#d6d6d6
| 588335 ||  || — || November 14, 2007 || Kitt Peak || Spacewatch ||  || align=right | 2.4 km || 
|-id=336 bgcolor=#fefefe
| 588336 ||  || — || November 2, 2007 || Kitt Peak || Spacewatch ||  || align=right data-sort-value="0.61" | 610 m || 
|-id=337 bgcolor=#d6d6d6
| 588337 ||  || — || November 2, 2007 || Kitt Peak || Spacewatch ||  || align=right | 1.8 km || 
|-id=338 bgcolor=#E9E9E9
| 588338 ||  || — || January 13, 2018 || Mount Lemmon || Mount Lemmon Survey ||  || align=right | 1.9 km || 
|-id=339 bgcolor=#E9E9E9
| 588339 ||  || — || September 10, 2002 || Palomar || NEAT || GEF || align=right | 1.3 km || 
|-id=340 bgcolor=#d6d6d6
| 588340 ||  || — || November 2, 2007 || Kitt Peak || Spacewatch ||  || align=right | 2.5 km || 
|-id=341 bgcolor=#E9E9E9
| 588341 ||  || — || November 12, 2007 || Catalina || CSS ||  || align=right | 1.9 km || 
|-id=342 bgcolor=#d6d6d6
| 588342 ||  || — || April 4, 2014 || Mount Lemmon || Mount Lemmon Survey ||  || align=right | 1.9 km || 
|-id=343 bgcolor=#fefefe
| 588343 ||  || — || February 9, 2016 || Haleakala || Pan-STARRS ||  || align=right data-sort-value="0.64" | 640 m || 
|-id=344 bgcolor=#fefefe
| 588344 ||  || — || November 7, 2007 || Kitt Peak || Spacewatch ||  || align=right data-sort-value="0.58" | 580 m || 
|-id=345 bgcolor=#d6d6d6
| 588345 ||  || — || September 3, 2016 || Mount Lemmon || Mount Lemmon Survey ||  || align=right | 1.7 km || 
|-id=346 bgcolor=#d6d6d6
| 588346 ||  || — || November 8, 2007 || Kitt Peak || Spacewatch ||  || align=right | 1.8 km || 
|-id=347 bgcolor=#d6d6d6
| 588347 ||  || — || November 1, 2007 || Mount Lemmon || Mount Lemmon Survey ||  || align=right | 1.6 km || 
|-id=348 bgcolor=#fefefe
| 588348 ||  || — || November 17, 2007 || Saint-Sulpice || B. Christophe ||  || align=right data-sort-value="0.67" | 670 m || 
|-id=349 bgcolor=#fefefe
| 588349 ||  || — || November 18, 2007 || Mount Lemmon || Mount Lemmon Survey ||  || align=right data-sort-value="0.72" | 720 m || 
|-id=350 bgcolor=#d6d6d6
| 588350 ||  || — || November 17, 2007 || Kitt Peak || Spacewatch ||  || align=right | 1.9 km || 
|-id=351 bgcolor=#E9E9E9
| 588351 ||  || — || January 17, 2004 || Kitt Peak || Spacewatch ||  || align=right | 2.7 km || 
|-id=352 bgcolor=#d6d6d6
| 588352 ||  || — || November 8, 2007 || Kitt Peak || Spacewatch ||  || align=right | 3.2 km || 
|-id=353 bgcolor=#fefefe
| 588353 ||  || — || November 19, 2007 || Mount Lemmon || Mount Lemmon Survey ||  || align=right data-sort-value="0.58" | 580 m || 
|-id=354 bgcolor=#d6d6d6
| 588354 ||  || — || November 2, 2007 || Kitt Peak || Spacewatch ||  || align=right | 2.6 km || 
|-id=355 bgcolor=#fefefe
| 588355 ||  || — || August 25, 2003 || Palomar || NEAT ||  || align=right data-sort-value="0.69" | 690 m || 
|-id=356 bgcolor=#d6d6d6
| 588356 ||  || — || November 19, 2007 || Mount Lemmon || Mount Lemmon Survey ||  || align=right | 2.1 km || 
|-id=357 bgcolor=#fefefe
| 588357 ||  || — || November 18, 2007 || Mount Lemmon || Mount Lemmon Survey ||  || align=right data-sort-value="0.69" | 690 m || 
|-id=358 bgcolor=#E9E9E9
| 588358 ||  || — || November 20, 2007 || Kitt Peak || Spacewatch ||  || align=right | 1.2 km || 
|-id=359 bgcolor=#E9E9E9
| 588359 ||  || — || November 4, 2007 || Kitt Peak || Spacewatch ||  || align=right | 1.9 km || 
|-id=360 bgcolor=#E9E9E9
| 588360 ||  || — || December 4, 2007 || Kitt Peak || Spacewatch ||  || align=right | 1.9 km || 
|-id=361 bgcolor=#d6d6d6
| 588361 ||  || — || September 15, 2007 || Mount Lemmon || Mount Lemmon Survey ||  || align=right | 2.5 km || 
|-id=362 bgcolor=#E9E9E9
| 588362 ||  || — || December 14, 2007 || Kitt Peak || Spacewatch ||  || align=right | 2.3 km || 
|-id=363 bgcolor=#d6d6d6
| 588363 ||  || — || November 6, 2007 || Mount Lemmon || Mount Lemmon Survey ||  || align=right | 2.9 km || 
|-id=364 bgcolor=#fefefe
| 588364 ||  || — || May 8, 2005 || Mount Lemmon || Mount Lemmon Survey ||  || align=right data-sort-value="0.83" | 830 m || 
|-id=365 bgcolor=#d6d6d6
| 588365 ||  || — || February 26, 2014 || Haleakala || Pan-STARRS ||  || align=right | 2.4 km || 
|-id=366 bgcolor=#d6d6d6
| 588366 ||  || — || December 3, 2012 || Mount Lemmon || Mount Lemmon Survey ||  || align=right | 2.1 km || 
|-id=367 bgcolor=#E9E9E9
| 588367 ||  || — || December 4, 2007 || Kitt Peak || Spacewatch ||  || align=right | 2.1 km || 
|-id=368 bgcolor=#d6d6d6
| 588368 ||  || — || December 15, 2007 || Mount Lemmon || Mount Lemmon Survey ||  || align=right | 2.0 km || 
|-id=369 bgcolor=#fefefe
| 588369 ||  || — || December 5, 2007 || Kitt Peak || Spacewatch ||  || align=right data-sort-value="0.68" | 680 m || 
|-id=370 bgcolor=#d6d6d6
| 588370 ||  || — || December 30, 2007 || Kitt Peak || Spacewatch ||  || align=right | 2.5 km || 
|-id=371 bgcolor=#fefefe
| 588371 ||  || — || December 16, 2007 || Mount Lemmon || Mount Lemmon Survey ||  || align=right data-sort-value="0.99" | 990 m || 
|-id=372 bgcolor=#FA8072
| 588372 ||  || — || December 30, 2007 || Mount Lemmon || Mount Lemmon Survey ||  || align=right data-sort-value="0.82" | 820 m || 
|-id=373 bgcolor=#d6d6d6
| 588373 ||  || — || December 16, 2007 || Mount Lemmon || Mount Lemmon Survey ||  || align=right | 1.9 km || 
|-id=374 bgcolor=#d6d6d6
| 588374 ||  || — || December 18, 2007 || Mount Lemmon || Mount Lemmon Survey ||  || align=right | 2.4 km || 
|-id=375 bgcolor=#d6d6d6
| 588375 ||  || — || October 10, 2016 || Mount Lemmon || Mount Lemmon Survey ||  || align=right | 3.0 km || 
|-id=376 bgcolor=#d6d6d6
| 588376 ||  || — || December 24, 1992 || Kitt Peak || Spacewatch ||  || align=right | 2.2 km || 
|-id=377 bgcolor=#fefefe
| 588377 ||  || — || November 19, 2007 || Kitt Peak || Spacewatch ||  || align=right data-sort-value="0.62" | 620 m || 
|-id=378 bgcolor=#d6d6d6
| 588378 ||  || — || December 22, 2012 || Haleakala || Pan-STARRS ||  || align=right | 2.2 km || 
|-id=379 bgcolor=#d6d6d6
| 588379 ||  || — || August 26, 2011 || Piszkesteto || K. Sárneczky ||  || align=right | 2.2 km || 
|-id=380 bgcolor=#E9E9E9
| 588380 ||  || — || November 19, 2007 || Kitt Peak || Spacewatch ||  || align=right | 1.6 km || 
|-id=381 bgcolor=#d6d6d6
| 588381 ||  || — || March 7, 2014 || Kitt Peak || Spacewatch ||  || align=right | 2.1 km || 
|-id=382 bgcolor=#d6d6d6
| 588382 ||  || — || March 24, 2014 || Haleakala || Pan-STARRS ||  || align=right | 2.4 km || 
|-id=383 bgcolor=#fefefe
| 588383 ||  || — || February 13, 2012 || Haleakala || Pan-STARRS ||  || align=right data-sort-value="0.52" | 520 m || 
|-id=384 bgcolor=#fefefe
| 588384 ||  || — || December 30, 2007 || Kitt Peak || Spacewatch ||  || align=right data-sort-value="0.63" | 630 m || 
|-id=385 bgcolor=#fefefe
| 588385 ||  || — || December 30, 2007 || Mount Lemmon || Mount Lemmon Survey ||  || align=right data-sort-value="0.55" | 550 m || 
|-id=386 bgcolor=#E9E9E9
| 588386 ||  || — || December 30, 2007 || Mount Lemmon || Mount Lemmon Survey ||  || align=right | 1.7 km || 
|-id=387 bgcolor=#fefefe
| 588387 ||  || — || December 18, 2007 || Mount Lemmon || Mount Lemmon Survey ||  || align=right data-sort-value="0.71" | 710 m || 
|-id=388 bgcolor=#d6d6d6
| 588388 ||  || — || December 16, 2007 || Mount Lemmon || Mount Lemmon Survey ||  || align=right | 2.7 km || 
|-id=389 bgcolor=#fefefe
| 588389 ||  || — || January 10, 2008 || Mount Lemmon || Mount Lemmon Survey ||  || align=right data-sort-value="0.64" | 640 m || 
|-id=390 bgcolor=#d6d6d6
| 588390 ||  || — || November 19, 2007 || Mount Lemmon || Mount Lemmon Survey ||  || align=right | 2.5 km || 
|-id=391 bgcolor=#fefefe
| 588391 ||  || — || January 10, 2008 || Kitt Peak || Spacewatch ||  || align=right data-sort-value="0.46" | 460 m || 
|-id=392 bgcolor=#d6d6d6
| 588392 ||  || — || September 24, 2006 || Kitt Peak || Spacewatch ||  || align=right | 1.9 km || 
|-id=393 bgcolor=#d6d6d6
| 588393 ||  || — || January 10, 2008 || Mount Lemmon || Mount Lemmon Survey ||  || align=right | 2.4 km || 
|-id=394 bgcolor=#fefefe
| 588394 ||  || — || November 18, 2007 || Kitt Peak || Spacewatch ||  || align=right data-sort-value="0.70" | 700 m || 
|-id=395 bgcolor=#fefefe
| 588395 ||  || — || January 11, 2008 || Kitt Peak || Spacewatch ||  || align=right data-sort-value="0.75" | 750 m || 
|-id=396 bgcolor=#d6d6d6
| 588396 ||  || — || January 11, 2008 || Kitt Peak || Spacewatch ||  || align=right | 2.1 km || 
|-id=397 bgcolor=#d6d6d6
| 588397 ||  || — || January 11, 2008 || Kitt Peak || Spacewatch ||  || align=right | 2.4 km || 
|-id=398 bgcolor=#d6d6d6
| 588398 ||  || — || January 11, 2008 || Kitt Peak || Spacewatch ||  || align=right | 2.4 km || 
|-id=399 bgcolor=#fefefe
| 588399 ||  || — || April 30, 2005 || Kitt Peak || Spacewatch ||  || align=right data-sort-value="0.64" | 640 m || 
|-id=400 bgcolor=#d6d6d6
| 588400 ||  || — || January 13, 2008 || Kitt Peak || Spacewatch ||  || align=right | 2.1 km || 
|}

588401–588500 

|-bgcolor=#d6d6d6
| 588401 ||  || — || December 30, 2007 || Kitt Peak || Spacewatch ||  || align=right | 2.0 km || 
|-id=402 bgcolor=#fefefe
| 588402 ||  || — || January 13, 2008 || Kitt Peak || Spacewatch ||  || align=right data-sort-value="0.59" | 590 m || 
|-id=403 bgcolor=#d6d6d6
| 588403 ||  || — || January 1, 2008 || Kitt Peak || Spacewatch ||  || align=right | 2.6 km || 
|-id=404 bgcolor=#fefefe
| 588404 ||  || — || October 21, 2003 || Kitt Peak || Spacewatch ||  || align=right data-sort-value="0.53" | 530 m || 
|-id=405 bgcolor=#fefefe
| 588405 ||  || — || November 11, 2007 || Mount Lemmon || Mount Lemmon Survey ||  || align=right data-sort-value="0.73" | 730 m || 
|-id=406 bgcolor=#fefefe
| 588406 ||  || — || January 15, 2008 || Kitt Peak || Spacewatch ||  || align=right data-sort-value="0.64" | 640 m || 
|-id=407 bgcolor=#d6d6d6
| 588407 ||  || — || January 6, 2008 || Mauna Kea || Mauna Kea Obs. ||  || align=right | 1.9 km || 
|-id=408 bgcolor=#fefefe
| 588408 ||  || — || January 6, 2008 || Mauna Kea || Mauna Kea Obs. ||  || align=right data-sort-value="0.66" | 660 m || 
|-id=409 bgcolor=#d6d6d6
| 588409 ||  || — || January 30, 2008 || Mount Lemmon || Mount Lemmon Survey ||  || align=right | 1.9 km || 
|-id=410 bgcolor=#fefefe
| 588410 ||  || — || January 11, 2008 || Mount Lemmon || Mount Lemmon Survey ||  || align=right data-sort-value="0.63" | 630 m || 
|-id=411 bgcolor=#d6d6d6
| 588411 ||  || — || January 15, 2008 || Mount Lemmon || Mount Lemmon Survey ||  || align=right | 1.6 km || 
|-id=412 bgcolor=#d6d6d6
| 588412 ||  || — || January 13, 2008 || Mount Lemmon || Mount Lemmon Survey ||  || align=right | 1.9 km || 
|-id=413 bgcolor=#d6d6d6
| 588413 ||  || — || January 1, 2008 || Kitt Peak || Spacewatch ||  || align=right | 2.2 km || 
|-id=414 bgcolor=#d6d6d6
| 588414 ||  || — || January 11, 2008 || Kitt Peak || Spacewatch ||  || align=right | 2.2 km || 
|-id=415 bgcolor=#d6d6d6
| 588415 ||  || — || September 25, 2016 || Haleakala || Pan-STARRS ||  || align=right | 2.4 km || 
|-id=416 bgcolor=#fefefe
| 588416 ||  || — || January 15, 2008 || Kitt Peak || Spacewatch ||  || align=right data-sort-value="0.58" | 580 m || 
|-id=417 bgcolor=#d6d6d6
| 588417 ||  || — || January 1, 2008 || Kitt Peak || Spacewatch ||  || align=right | 2.4 km || 
|-id=418 bgcolor=#d6d6d6
| 588418 ||  || — || January 28, 2008 || Altschwendt || W. Ries ||  || align=right | 2.1 km || 
|-id=419 bgcolor=#d6d6d6
| 588419 ||  || — || January 30, 2008 || Mount Lemmon || Mount Lemmon Survey ||  || align=right | 2.5 km || 
|-id=420 bgcolor=#d6d6d6
| 588420 ||  || — || January 30, 2008 || Mount Lemmon || Mount Lemmon Survey ||  || align=right | 1.9 km || 
|-id=421 bgcolor=#fefefe
| 588421 ||  || — || January 18, 2008 || Mount Lemmon || Mount Lemmon Survey ||  || align=right data-sort-value="0.60" | 600 m || 
|-id=422 bgcolor=#d6d6d6
| 588422 ||  || — || January 18, 2008 || Mount Lemmon || Mount Lemmon Survey ||  || align=right | 2.2 km || 
|-id=423 bgcolor=#fefefe
| 588423 ||  || — || November 16, 2003 || Catalina || CSS ||  || align=right data-sort-value="0.72" | 720 m || 
|-id=424 bgcolor=#d6d6d6
| 588424 ||  || — || February 2, 2008 || Mount Lemmon || Mount Lemmon Survey ||  || align=right | 2.6 km || 
|-id=425 bgcolor=#d6d6d6
| 588425 ||  || — || December 6, 2007 || Mount Lemmon || Mount Lemmon Survey ||  || align=right | 3.0 km || 
|-id=426 bgcolor=#fefefe
| 588426 ||  || — || February 2, 2008 || Kitt Peak || Spacewatch ||  || align=right data-sort-value="0.93" | 930 m || 
|-id=427 bgcolor=#d6d6d6
| 588427 ||  || — || February 2, 2008 || Kitt Peak || Spacewatch ||  || align=right | 2.5 km || 
|-id=428 bgcolor=#d6d6d6
| 588428 ||  || — || February 2, 2008 || Kitt Peak || Spacewatch ||  || align=right | 2.3 km || 
|-id=429 bgcolor=#fefefe
| 588429 ||  || — || December 19, 2007 || Mount Lemmon || Mount Lemmon Survey ||  || align=right | 1.2 km || 
|-id=430 bgcolor=#d6d6d6
| 588430 ||  || — || February 7, 2008 || Mount Lemmon || Mount Lemmon Survey ||  || align=right | 2.2 km || 
|-id=431 bgcolor=#d6d6d6
| 588431 ||  || — || February 7, 2008 || Mount Lemmon || Mount Lemmon Survey ||  || align=right | 2.0 km || 
|-id=432 bgcolor=#d6d6d6
| 588432 ||  || — || February 8, 2008 || Mount Lemmon || Mount Lemmon Survey ||  || align=right | 2.2 km || 
|-id=433 bgcolor=#fefefe
| 588433 ||  || — || February 14, 2004 || Kitt Peak || Spacewatch ||  || align=right data-sort-value="0.57" | 570 m || 
|-id=434 bgcolor=#d6d6d6
| 588434 ||  || — || February 7, 2008 || Kitt Peak || Spacewatch ||  || align=right | 1.9 km || 
|-id=435 bgcolor=#d6d6d6
| 588435 ||  || — || January 13, 2008 || Kitt Peak || Spacewatch ||  || align=right | 1.9 km || 
|-id=436 bgcolor=#d6d6d6
| 588436 ||  || — || August 31, 2005 || Kitt Peak || Spacewatch ||  || align=right | 2.7 km || 
|-id=437 bgcolor=#fefefe
| 588437 ||  || — || February 10, 2008 || Kitt Peak || Spacewatch ||  || align=right data-sort-value="0.84" | 840 m || 
|-id=438 bgcolor=#fefefe
| 588438 ||  || — || February 10, 2008 || Mount Lemmon || Mount Lemmon Survey ||  || align=right data-sort-value="0.87" | 870 m || 
|-id=439 bgcolor=#fefefe
| 588439 ||  || — || February 7, 2008 || Mount Lemmon || Mount Lemmon Survey ||  || align=right data-sort-value="0.56" | 560 m || 
|-id=440 bgcolor=#d6d6d6
| 588440 ||  || — || February 12, 2008 || Kitt Peak || Spacewatch ||  || align=right | 2.8 km || 
|-id=441 bgcolor=#d6d6d6
| 588441 ||  || — || February 8, 2008 || Kitt Peak || Spacewatch ||  || align=right | 2.3 km || 
|-id=442 bgcolor=#fefefe
| 588442 ||  || — || January 30, 2008 || Mount Lemmon || Mount Lemmon Survey || MAS || align=right data-sort-value="0.54" | 540 m || 
|-id=443 bgcolor=#fefefe
| 588443 ||  || — || February 8, 2008 || Mount Lemmon || Mount Lemmon Survey ||  || align=right data-sort-value="0.50" | 500 m || 
|-id=444 bgcolor=#fefefe
| 588444 ||  || — || February 8, 2008 || Kitt Peak || Spacewatch ||  || align=right data-sort-value="0.61" | 610 m || 
|-id=445 bgcolor=#d6d6d6
| 588445 ||  || — || February 9, 2008 || Kitt Peak || Spacewatch ||  || align=right | 2.4 km || 
|-id=446 bgcolor=#fefefe
| 588446 ||  || — || February 9, 2008 || Kitt Peak || Spacewatch ||  || align=right data-sort-value="0.65" | 650 m || 
|-id=447 bgcolor=#fefefe
| 588447 ||  || — || October 2, 2006 || Mount Lemmon || Mount Lemmon Survey ||  || align=right data-sort-value="0.74" | 740 m || 
|-id=448 bgcolor=#d6d6d6
| 588448 ||  || — || February 10, 2008 || La Canada || J. Lacruz ||  || align=right | 2.6 km || 
|-id=449 bgcolor=#fefefe
| 588449 ||  || — || February 2, 2008 || Kitt Peak || Spacewatch ||  || align=right data-sort-value="0.71" | 710 m || 
|-id=450 bgcolor=#d6d6d6
| 588450 ||  || — || February 14, 2008 || Taunus || E. Schwab, R. Kling ||  || align=right | 2.3 km || 
|-id=451 bgcolor=#d6d6d6
| 588451 ||  || — || February 7, 2008 || Kitt Peak || Spacewatch ||  || align=right | 1.7 km || 
|-id=452 bgcolor=#fefefe
| 588452 ||  || — || October 3, 2006 || Mount Lemmon || Mount Lemmon Survey ||  || align=right data-sort-value="0.94" | 940 m || 
|-id=453 bgcolor=#fefefe
| 588453 ||  || — || February 2, 2008 || Mount Lemmon || Mount Lemmon Survey ||  || align=right data-sort-value="0.66" | 660 m || 
|-id=454 bgcolor=#d6d6d6
| 588454 ||  || — || January 18, 2013 || Kitt Peak || Spacewatch ||  || align=right | 2.2 km || 
|-id=455 bgcolor=#d6d6d6
| 588455 ||  || — || February 12, 2008 || Kitt Peak || Spacewatch ||  || align=right | 1.9 km || 
|-id=456 bgcolor=#fefefe
| 588456 ||  || — || February 12, 2008 || Mount Lemmon || Mount Lemmon Survey ||  || align=right data-sort-value="0.80" | 800 m || 
|-id=457 bgcolor=#d6d6d6
| 588457 ||  || — || December 23, 2012 || Haleakala || Pan-STARRS ||  || align=right | 2.2 km || 
|-id=458 bgcolor=#fefefe
| 588458 ||  || — || August 12, 2013 || Haleakala || Pan-STARRS ||  || align=right data-sort-value="0.52" | 520 m || 
|-id=459 bgcolor=#E9E9E9
| 588459 ||  || — || January 10, 2008 || Mount Lemmon || Mount Lemmon Survey ||  || align=right data-sort-value="0.85" | 850 m || 
|-id=460 bgcolor=#d6d6d6
| 588460 ||  || — || March 19, 2009 || Kitt Peak || Spacewatch ||  || align=right | 2.3 km || 
|-id=461 bgcolor=#d6d6d6
| 588461 ||  || — || October 12, 2016 || Mount Lemmon || Mount Lemmon Survey ||  || align=right | 2.2 km || 
|-id=462 bgcolor=#fefefe
| 588462 ||  || — || October 3, 2010 || Catalina || CSS ||  || align=right data-sort-value="0.66" | 660 m || 
|-id=463 bgcolor=#fefefe
| 588463 ||  || — || February 7, 2008 || Kitt Peak || Spacewatch ||  || align=right data-sort-value="0.68" | 680 m || 
|-id=464 bgcolor=#fefefe
| 588464 ||  || — || March 14, 2012 || Mount Lemmon || Mount Lemmon Survey ||  || align=right data-sort-value="0.60" | 600 m || 
|-id=465 bgcolor=#fefefe
| 588465 ||  || — || July 2, 2013 || Haleakala || Pan-STARRS ||  || align=right data-sort-value="0.67" | 670 m || 
|-id=466 bgcolor=#d6d6d6
| 588466 ||  || — || February 8, 2008 || Kitt Peak || Spacewatch ||  || align=right | 2.3 km || 
|-id=467 bgcolor=#d6d6d6
| 588467 ||  || — || February 9, 2008 || Kitt Peak || Spacewatch ||  || align=right | 2.5 km || 
|-id=468 bgcolor=#d6d6d6
| 588468 ||  || — || February 2, 2008 || Mount Lemmon || Mount Lemmon Survey ||  || align=right | 2.0 km || 
|-id=469 bgcolor=#d6d6d6
| 588469 ||  || — || February 13, 2008 || Mount Lemmon || Mount Lemmon Survey ||  || align=right | 2.1 km || 
|-id=470 bgcolor=#d6d6d6
| 588470 ||  || — || February 7, 2008 || Kitt Peak || Spacewatch ||  || align=right | 2.8 km || 
|-id=471 bgcolor=#d6d6d6
| 588471 ||  || — || February 28, 2008 || Kitt Peak || Spacewatch ||  || align=right | 2.2 km || 
|-id=472 bgcolor=#d6d6d6
| 588472 ||  || — || February 29, 2008 || Mount Lemmon || Mount Lemmon Survey ||  || align=right | 2.8 km || 
|-id=473 bgcolor=#d6d6d6
| 588473 ||  || — || February 29, 2008 || Mount Lemmon || Mount Lemmon Survey ||  || align=right | 2.6 km || 
|-id=474 bgcolor=#d6d6d6
| 588474 ||  || — || February 28, 2008 || Mount Lemmon || Mount Lemmon Survey ||  || align=right | 2.5 km || 
|-id=475 bgcolor=#d6d6d6
| 588475 ||  || — || February 29, 2008 || Catalina || CSS ||  || align=right | 2.6 km || 
|-id=476 bgcolor=#d6d6d6
| 588476 ||  || — || February 26, 2008 || Mount Lemmon || Mount Lemmon Survey ||  || align=right | 2.1 km || 
|-id=477 bgcolor=#d6d6d6
| 588477 ||  || — || February 28, 2008 || Mount Lemmon || Mount Lemmon Survey ||  || align=right | 2.7 km || 
|-id=478 bgcolor=#d6d6d6
| 588478 ||  || — || February 28, 2008 || Mount Lemmon || Mount Lemmon Survey ||  || align=right | 2.5 km || 
|-id=479 bgcolor=#d6d6d6
| 588479 ||  || — || February 28, 2008 || Mount Lemmon || Mount Lemmon Survey ||  || align=right | 2.3 km || 
|-id=480 bgcolor=#E9E9E9
| 588480 ||  || — || February 28, 2008 || Mount Lemmon || Mount Lemmon Survey ||  || align=right | 1.2 km || 
|-id=481 bgcolor=#d6d6d6
| 588481 ||  || — || February 26, 2008 || Mount Lemmon || Mount Lemmon Survey ||  || align=right | 1.8 km || 
|-id=482 bgcolor=#fefefe
| 588482 ||  || — || February 29, 2008 || Mount Lemmon || Mount Lemmon Survey ||  || align=right data-sort-value="0.78" | 780 m || 
|-id=483 bgcolor=#d6d6d6
| 588483 ||  || — || February 28, 2008 || Kitt Peak || Spacewatch ||  || align=right | 2.4 km || 
|-id=484 bgcolor=#E9E9E9
| 588484 ||  || — || February 29, 2008 || Kitt Peak || Spacewatch ||  || align=right data-sort-value="0.66" | 660 m || 
|-id=485 bgcolor=#d6d6d6
| 588485 ||  || — || March 1, 2008 || Mount Lemmon || Mount Lemmon Survey ||  || align=right | 2.2 km || 
|-id=486 bgcolor=#d6d6d6
| 588486 ||  || — || March 1, 2008 || Mount Lemmon || Mount Lemmon Survey ||  || align=right | 2.3 km || 
|-id=487 bgcolor=#d6d6d6
| 588487 ||  || — || March 1, 2008 || Kitt Peak || Spacewatch ||  || align=right | 2.8 km || 
|-id=488 bgcolor=#d6d6d6
| 588488 ||  || — || October 13, 2005 || Kitt Peak || Spacewatch ||  || align=right | 2.3 km || 
|-id=489 bgcolor=#d6d6d6
| 588489 ||  || — || September 14, 2005 || Kitt Peak || Spacewatch ||  || align=right | 2.5 km || 
|-id=490 bgcolor=#d6d6d6
| 588490 ||  || — || March 6, 2008 || Mount Lemmon || Mount Lemmon Survey ||  || align=right | 2.5 km || 
|-id=491 bgcolor=#d6d6d6
| 588491 ||  || — || April 10, 2003 || Kitt Peak || Spacewatch ||  || align=right | 3.3 km || 
|-id=492 bgcolor=#d6d6d6
| 588492 ||  || — || August 6, 2005 || Palomar || NEAT ||  || align=right | 3.2 km || 
|-id=493 bgcolor=#d6d6d6
| 588493 ||  || — || August 30, 2005 || Kitt Peak || Spacewatch ||  || align=right | 2.8 km || 
|-id=494 bgcolor=#E9E9E9
| 588494 ||  || — || November 16, 2006 || Catalina || CSS ||  || align=right | 1.7 km || 
|-id=495 bgcolor=#fefefe
| 588495 ||  || — || January 15, 2008 || Mount Lemmon || Mount Lemmon Survey ||  || align=right data-sort-value="0.66" | 660 m || 
|-id=496 bgcolor=#d6d6d6
| 588496 ||  || — || April 1, 2003 || Bergisch Gladbach || W. Bickel || EOS || align=right | 2.2 km || 
|-id=497 bgcolor=#d6d6d6
| 588497 ||  || — || March 1, 2008 || Kitt Peak || Spacewatch ||  || align=right | 2.0 km || 
|-id=498 bgcolor=#d6d6d6
| 588498 ||  || — || March 1, 2008 || Kitt Peak || Spacewatch ||  || align=right | 2.5 km || 
|-id=499 bgcolor=#E9E9E9
| 588499 ||  || — || March 10, 2008 || Kitt Peak || Spacewatch ||  || align=right | 1.6 km || 
|-id=500 bgcolor=#d6d6d6
| 588500 ||  || — || March 10, 2008 || Kitt Peak || Spacewatch ||  || align=right | 2.2 km || 
|}

588501–588600 

|-bgcolor=#d6d6d6
| 588501 ||  || — || March 1, 2008 || Kitt Peak || Spacewatch ||  || align=right | 2.3 km || 
|-id=502 bgcolor=#d6d6d6
| 588502 ||  || — || March 11, 2008 || Mount Lemmon || Mount Lemmon Survey ||  || align=right | 2.6 km || 
|-id=503 bgcolor=#d6d6d6
| 588503 ||  || — || March 27, 2008 || Mount Lemmon || Mount Lemmon Survey ||  || align=right | 2.8 km || 
|-id=504 bgcolor=#d6d6d6
| 588504 ||  || — || November 25, 2011 || Haleakala || Pan-STARRS ||  || align=right | 3.2 km || 
|-id=505 bgcolor=#d6d6d6
| 588505 ||  || — || June 22, 2014 || Kitt Peak || Spacewatch ||  || align=right | 2.9 km || 
|-id=506 bgcolor=#d6d6d6
| 588506 ||  || — || October 24, 2011 || Haleakala || Pan-STARRS ||  || align=right | 2.3 km || 
|-id=507 bgcolor=#d6d6d6
| 588507 ||  || — || February 28, 2014 || Haleakala || Pan-STARRS ||  || align=right | 1.9 km || 
|-id=508 bgcolor=#d6d6d6
| 588508 ||  || — || January 17, 2013 || Haleakala || Pan-STARRS ||  || align=right | 3.0 km || 
|-id=509 bgcolor=#d6d6d6
| 588509 ||  || — || September 30, 2006 || Mount Lemmon || Mount Lemmon Survey ||  || align=right | 1.9 km || 
|-id=510 bgcolor=#d6d6d6
| 588510 ||  || — || January 18, 2013 || Mount Lemmon || Mount Lemmon Survey ||  || align=right | 2.8 km || 
|-id=511 bgcolor=#d6d6d6
| 588511 ||  || — || July 12, 2015 || Haleakala || Pan-STARRS ||  || align=right | 2.4 km || 
|-id=512 bgcolor=#d6d6d6
| 588512 ||  || — || June 6, 2014 || Haleakala || Pan-STARRS ||  || align=right | 2.6 km || 
|-id=513 bgcolor=#d6d6d6
| 588513 ||  || — || November 13, 2012 || Mount Lemmon || Mount Lemmon Survey ||  || align=right | 3.6 km || 
|-id=514 bgcolor=#d6d6d6
| 588514 ||  || — || March 11, 2008 || Mount Lemmon || Mount Lemmon Survey ||  || align=right | 2.2 km || 
|-id=515 bgcolor=#d6d6d6
| 588515 ||  || — || March 5, 2008 || Mount Lemmon || Mount Lemmon Survey ||  || align=right | 2.9 km || 
|-id=516 bgcolor=#d6d6d6
| 588516 ||  || — || March 10, 2008 || Mount Lemmon || Mount Lemmon Survey ||  || align=right | 2.9 km || 
|-id=517 bgcolor=#d6d6d6
| 588517 ||  || — || March 5, 2008 || Mount Lemmon || Mount Lemmon Survey ||  || align=right | 1.9 km || 
|-id=518 bgcolor=#d6d6d6
| 588518 ||  || — || February 10, 2008 || Mount Lemmon || Mount Lemmon Survey ||  || align=right | 2.5 km || 
|-id=519 bgcolor=#d6d6d6
| 588519 ||  || — || March 1, 2008 || Kitt Peak || Spacewatch ||  || align=right | 2.3 km || 
|-id=520 bgcolor=#d6d6d6
| 588520 ||  || — || March 5, 2008 || Kitt Peak || Spacewatch ||  || align=right | 2.4 km || 
|-id=521 bgcolor=#d6d6d6
| 588521 ||  || — || March 7, 2008 || Mount Lemmon || Mount Lemmon Survey ||  || align=right | 2.2 km || 
|-id=522 bgcolor=#d6d6d6
| 588522 ||  || — || March 9, 2008 || Mount Lemmon || Mount Lemmon Survey ||  || align=right | 2.2 km || 
|-id=523 bgcolor=#d6d6d6
| 588523 ||  || — || March 8, 2008 || Mount Lemmon || Mount Lemmon Survey ||  || align=right | 2.1 km || 
|-id=524 bgcolor=#d6d6d6
| 588524 ||  || — || March 10, 2008 || Kitt Peak || Spacewatch ||  || align=right | 2.3 km || 
|-id=525 bgcolor=#fefefe
| 588525 ||  || — || January 11, 2008 || Mount Lemmon || Mount Lemmon Survey ||  || align=right data-sort-value="0.62" | 620 m || 
|-id=526 bgcolor=#fefefe
| 588526 ||  || — || February 8, 2008 || Kitt Peak || Spacewatch ||  || align=right data-sort-value="0.73" | 730 m || 
|-id=527 bgcolor=#fefefe
| 588527 ||  || — || February 10, 2008 || Kitt Peak || Spacewatch ||  || align=right data-sort-value="0.76" | 760 m || 
|-id=528 bgcolor=#d6d6d6
| 588528 ||  || — || August 11, 2004 || Socorro || LINEAR ||  || align=right | 2.9 km || 
|-id=529 bgcolor=#d6d6d6
| 588529 ||  || — || March 27, 2008 || Kitt Peak || Spacewatch ||  || align=right | 2.7 km || 
|-id=530 bgcolor=#d6d6d6
| 588530 ||  || — || February 13, 2008 || Mount Lemmon || Mount Lemmon Survey ||  || align=right | 2.6 km || 
|-id=531 bgcolor=#d6d6d6
| 588531 ||  || — || March 8, 2008 || Mount Lemmon || Mount Lemmon Survey ||  || align=right | 2.1 km || 
|-id=532 bgcolor=#d6d6d6
| 588532 ||  || — || March 30, 2008 || Kitt Peak || Spacewatch ||  || align=right | 2.5 km || 
|-id=533 bgcolor=#d6d6d6
| 588533 ||  || — || January 28, 2017 || Haleakala || Pan-STARRS ||  || align=right | 1.7 km || 
|-id=534 bgcolor=#d6d6d6
| 588534 ||  || — || March 10, 2008 || Kitt Peak || Spacewatch ||  || align=right | 1.9 km || 
|-id=535 bgcolor=#d6d6d6
| 588535 ||  || — || March 29, 2008 || Mount Lemmon || Mount Lemmon Survey ||  || align=right | 2.2 km || 
|-id=536 bgcolor=#E9E9E9
| 588536 ||  || — || March 30, 2008 || Kitt Peak || Spacewatch ||  || align=right data-sort-value="0.61" | 610 m || 
|-id=537 bgcolor=#d6d6d6
| 588537 ||  || — || March 31, 2008 || Kitt Peak || Spacewatch ||  || align=right | 2.4 km || 
|-id=538 bgcolor=#d6d6d6
| 588538 ||  || — || March 31, 2008 || Kitt Peak || Spacewatch ||  || align=right | 2.6 km || 
|-id=539 bgcolor=#d6d6d6
| 588539 ||  || — || March 31, 2008 || Mount Lemmon || Mount Lemmon Survey ||  || align=right | 1.9 km || 
|-id=540 bgcolor=#d6d6d6
| 588540 ||  || — || March 11, 2008 || Kitt Peak || Spacewatch ||  || align=right | 2.7 km || 
|-id=541 bgcolor=#d6d6d6
| 588541 ||  || — || March 30, 2008 || Piszkesteto || K. Sárneczky ||  || align=right | 3.3 km || 
|-id=542 bgcolor=#E9E9E9
| 588542 ||  || — || March 31, 2008 || Kitt Peak || Spacewatch ||  || align=right data-sort-value="0.91" | 910 m || 
|-id=543 bgcolor=#E9E9E9
| 588543 ||  || — || March 27, 2008 || Mount Lemmon || Mount Lemmon Survey ||  || align=right | 1.2 km || 
|-id=544 bgcolor=#d6d6d6
| 588544 ||  || — || September 7, 2004 || Kitt Peak || Spacewatch ||  || align=right | 2.8 km || 
|-id=545 bgcolor=#d6d6d6
| 588545 ||  || — || March 31, 2008 || Kitt Peak || Spacewatch || 3:2 || align=right | 3.4 km || 
|-id=546 bgcolor=#d6d6d6
| 588546 ||  || — || March 31, 2008 || Mount Lemmon || Mount Lemmon Survey ||  || align=right | 2.5 km || 
|-id=547 bgcolor=#d6d6d6
| 588547 ||  || — || April 5, 2014 || Haleakala || Pan-STARRS ||  || align=right | 1.9 km || 
|-id=548 bgcolor=#d6d6d6
| 588548 ||  || — || March 27, 2008 || Mount Lemmon || Mount Lemmon Survey ||  || align=right | 2.0 km || 
|-id=549 bgcolor=#fefefe
| 588549 ||  || — || March 28, 2008 || Mount Lemmon || Mount Lemmon Survey ||  || align=right data-sort-value="0.83" | 830 m || 
|-id=550 bgcolor=#d6d6d6
| 588550 ||  || — || March 8, 2008 || Kitt Peak || Spacewatch ||  || align=right | 2.7 km || 
|-id=551 bgcolor=#fefefe
| 588551 ||  || — || April 3, 2008 || Kitt Peak || Spacewatch || H || align=right data-sort-value="0.50" | 500 m || 
|-id=552 bgcolor=#d6d6d6
| 588552 ||  || — || April 3, 2008 || Kitt Peak || Spacewatch ||  || align=right | 2.0 km || 
|-id=553 bgcolor=#d6d6d6
| 588553 ||  || — || April 3, 2008 || Kitt Peak || Spacewatch || Tj (2.98) || align=right | 2.4 km || 
|-id=554 bgcolor=#d6d6d6
| 588554 ||  || — || April 5, 2008 || Mount Lemmon || Mount Lemmon Survey ||  || align=right | 2.0 km || 
|-id=555 bgcolor=#d6d6d6
| 588555 ||  || — || April 5, 2008 || Mount Lemmon || Mount Lemmon Survey ||  || align=right | 2.1 km || 
|-id=556 bgcolor=#d6d6d6
| 588556 ||  || — || April 5, 2008 || Mount Lemmon || Mount Lemmon Survey ||  || align=right | 2.8 km || 
|-id=557 bgcolor=#fefefe
| 588557 ||  || — || November 13, 2002 || Palomar || NEAT ||  || align=right data-sort-value="0.73" | 730 m || 
|-id=558 bgcolor=#E9E9E9
| 588558 ||  || — || April 7, 2008 || Kitt Peak || Spacewatch ||  || align=right data-sort-value="0.77" | 770 m || 
|-id=559 bgcolor=#d6d6d6
| 588559 ||  || — || March 28, 2008 || Mount Lemmon || Mount Lemmon Survey ||  || align=right | 2.8 km || 
|-id=560 bgcolor=#d6d6d6
| 588560 ||  || — || September 13, 2005 || Kitt Peak || Spacewatch ||  || align=right | 2.2 km || 
|-id=561 bgcolor=#d6d6d6
| 588561 ||  || — || March 5, 2008 || Mount Lemmon || Mount Lemmon Survey ||  || align=right | 2.9 km || 
|-id=562 bgcolor=#d6d6d6
| 588562 ||  || — || April 1, 2008 || Mount Lemmon || Mount Lemmon Survey ||  || align=right | 2.4 km || 
|-id=563 bgcolor=#d6d6d6
| 588563 ||  || — || April 1, 2008 || Mount Lemmon || Mount Lemmon Survey ||  || align=right | 2.0 km || 
|-id=564 bgcolor=#d6d6d6
| 588564 ||  || — || December 16, 2011 || Mount Lemmon || Mount Lemmon Survey ||  || align=right | 2.8 km || 
|-id=565 bgcolor=#d6d6d6
| 588565 ||  || — || May 6, 2014 || Haleakala || Pan-STARRS ||  || align=right | 2.5 km || 
|-id=566 bgcolor=#d6d6d6
| 588566 ||  || — || February 19, 2013 || Kitt Peak || Spacewatch ||  || align=right | 2.4 km || 
|-id=567 bgcolor=#d6d6d6
| 588567 ||  || — || April 8, 2008 || Kitt Peak || Spacewatch ||  || align=right | 2.4 km || 
|-id=568 bgcolor=#d6d6d6
| 588568 ||  || — || April 7, 2008 || Kitt Peak || Spacewatch ||  || align=right | 2.0 km || 
|-id=569 bgcolor=#d6d6d6
| 588569 ||  || — || October 19, 2016 || Mount Lemmon || Mount Lemmon Survey ||  || align=right | 2.0 km || 
|-id=570 bgcolor=#d6d6d6
| 588570 ||  || — || March 5, 2013 || Mount Lemmon || Mount Lemmon Survey ||  || align=right | 2.9 km || 
|-id=571 bgcolor=#E9E9E9
| 588571 ||  || — || October 12, 2010 || Mount Lemmon || Mount Lemmon Survey ||  || align=right | 2.1 km || 
|-id=572 bgcolor=#d6d6d6
| 588572 ||  || — || March 12, 2008 || Kitt Peak || Spacewatch ||  || align=right | 3.4 km || 
|-id=573 bgcolor=#d6d6d6
| 588573 ||  || — || April 7, 2008 || Kitt Peak || Spacewatch ||  || align=right | 2.4 km || 
|-id=574 bgcolor=#d6d6d6
| 588574 ||  || — || March 7, 2008 || Kitt Peak || Spacewatch ||  || align=right | 2.8 km || 
|-id=575 bgcolor=#d6d6d6
| 588575 ||  || — || December 30, 2011 || Kitt Peak || Spacewatch ||  || align=right | 2.5 km || 
|-id=576 bgcolor=#d6d6d6
| 588576 ||  || — || April 14, 2008 || Mount Lemmon || Mount Lemmon Survey ||  || align=right | 2.1 km || 
|-id=577 bgcolor=#d6d6d6
| 588577 ||  || — || April 5, 2008 || Mount Lemmon || Mount Lemmon Survey ||  || align=right | 2.9 km || 
|-id=578 bgcolor=#d6d6d6
| 588578 ||  || — || April 15, 2008 || Mount Lemmon || Mount Lemmon Survey ||  || align=right | 2.3 km || 
|-id=579 bgcolor=#d6d6d6
| 588579 ||  || — || April 4, 2008 || Mount Lemmon || Mount Lemmon Survey ||  || align=right | 2.9 km || 
|-id=580 bgcolor=#d6d6d6
| 588580 ||  || — || August 21, 2015 || Haleakala || Pan-STARRS ||  || align=right | 2.2 km || 
|-id=581 bgcolor=#d6d6d6
| 588581 ||  || — || December 21, 2006 || Kitt Peak || L. H. Wasserman ||  || align=right | 2.7 km || 
|-id=582 bgcolor=#fefefe
| 588582 ||  || — || April 11, 2008 || Mount Lemmon || Mount Lemmon Survey ||  || align=right data-sort-value="0.48" | 480 m || 
|-id=583 bgcolor=#d6d6d6
| 588583 ||  || — || April 3, 2008 || Mount Lemmon || Mount Lemmon Survey ||  || align=right | 2.0 km || 
|-id=584 bgcolor=#E9E9E9
| 588584 ||  || — || April 11, 2008 || Mount Lemmon || Mount Lemmon Survey ||  || align=right data-sort-value="0.70" | 700 m || 
|-id=585 bgcolor=#d6d6d6
| 588585 ||  || — || April 24, 2008 || Kitt Peak || Spacewatch ||  || align=right | 3.3 km || 
|-id=586 bgcolor=#d6d6d6
| 588586 ||  || — || April 3, 2008 || Mount Lemmon || Mount Lemmon Survey ||  || align=right | 2.1 km || 
|-id=587 bgcolor=#d6d6d6
| 588587 ||  || — || March 28, 2008 || Mount Lemmon || Mount Lemmon Survey ||  || align=right | 2.0 km || 
|-id=588 bgcolor=#fefefe
| 588588 ||  || — || October 11, 2006 || Kitt Peak || Spacewatch ||  || align=right data-sort-value="0.96" | 960 m || 
|-id=589 bgcolor=#d6d6d6
| 588589 ||  || — || April 30, 2008 || Kitt Peak || Spacewatch ||  || align=right | 2.5 km || 
|-id=590 bgcolor=#E9E9E9
| 588590 ||  || — || April 30, 2008 || Mount Lemmon || Mount Lemmon Survey ||  || align=right data-sort-value="0.92" | 920 m || 
|-id=591 bgcolor=#E9E9E9
| 588591 ||  || — || April 29, 2012 || Mount Lemmon || Mount Lemmon Survey ||  || align=right data-sort-value="0.66" | 660 m || 
|-id=592 bgcolor=#d6d6d6
| 588592 ||  || — || April 25, 2008 || Kitt Peak || Spacewatch ||  || align=right | 2.9 km || 
|-id=593 bgcolor=#d6d6d6
| 588593 ||  || — || November 25, 2011 || Haleakala || Pan-STARRS ||  || align=right | 2.4 km || 
|-id=594 bgcolor=#E9E9E9
| 588594 ||  || — || December 15, 2014 || Mount Lemmon || Mount Lemmon Survey ||  || align=right data-sort-value="0.68" | 680 m || 
|-id=595 bgcolor=#d6d6d6
| 588595 ||  || — || April 29, 2008 || Kitt Peak || Spacewatch ||  || align=right | 2.7 km || 
|-id=596 bgcolor=#d6d6d6
| 588596 ||  || — || April 29, 2008 || Kitt Peak || Spacewatch ||  || align=right | 2.4 km || 
|-id=597 bgcolor=#E9E9E9
| 588597 ||  || — || May 1, 2008 || Catalina || CSS ||  || align=right data-sort-value="0.82" | 820 m || 
|-id=598 bgcolor=#d6d6d6
| 588598 ||  || — || May 1, 2008 || Siding Spring || SSS ||  || align=right | 3.9 km || 
|-id=599 bgcolor=#d6d6d6
| 588599 ||  || — || May 3, 2008 || Mount Lemmon || Mount Lemmon Survey ||  || align=right | 2.8 km || 
|-id=600 bgcolor=#E9E9E9
| 588600 ||  || — || April 8, 2008 || Kitt Peak || Spacewatch ||  || align=right data-sort-value="0.95" | 950 m || 
|}

588601–588700 

|-bgcolor=#E9E9E9
| 588601 ||  || — || May 4, 2008 || Kitt Peak || Spacewatch ||  || align=right data-sort-value="0.69" | 690 m || 
|-id=602 bgcolor=#d6d6d6
| 588602 ||  || — || May 3, 2008 || Kitt Peak || Spacewatch ||  || align=right | 3.5 km || 
|-id=603 bgcolor=#d6d6d6
| 588603 ||  || — || May 12, 2008 || Siding Spring || SSS ||  || align=right | 3.2 km || 
|-id=604 bgcolor=#fefefe
| 588604 ||  || — || May 14, 2008 || Mount Lemmon || Mount Lemmon Survey ||  || align=right data-sort-value="0.65" | 650 m || 
|-id=605 bgcolor=#d6d6d6
| 588605 ||  || — || October 7, 2016 || Mount Lemmon || Mount Lemmon Survey ||  || align=right | 2.3 km || 
|-id=606 bgcolor=#E9E9E9
| 588606 ||  || — || May 14, 2008 || Kitt Peak || Spacewatch ||  || align=right data-sort-value="0.64" | 640 m || 
|-id=607 bgcolor=#E9E9E9
| 588607 ||  || — || March 29, 2008 || Kitt Peak || Spacewatch ||  || align=right data-sort-value="0.67" | 670 m || 
|-id=608 bgcolor=#E9E9E9
| 588608 ||  || — || October 11, 2001 || Kitt Peak || Spacewatch || MAR || align=right | 1.0 km || 
|-id=609 bgcolor=#E9E9E9
| 588609 ||  || — || May 28, 2008 || Kitt Peak || Spacewatch ||  || align=right data-sort-value="0.75" | 750 m || 
|-id=610 bgcolor=#E9E9E9
| 588610 ||  || — || May 28, 2008 || Kitt Peak || Spacewatch ||  || align=right | 1.4 km || 
|-id=611 bgcolor=#E9E9E9
| 588611 ||  || — || May 29, 2008 || Kitt Peak || Spacewatch ||  || align=right data-sort-value="0.73" | 730 m || 
|-id=612 bgcolor=#d6d6d6
| 588612 ||  || — || April 19, 2002 || Kitt Peak || Spacewatch ||  || align=right | 2.6 km || 
|-id=613 bgcolor=#E9E9E9
| 588613 ||  || — || May 29, 2008 || Mount Lemmon || Mount Lemmon Survey ||  || align=right data-sort-value="0.67" | 670 m || 
|-id=614 bgcolor=#d6d6d6
| 588614 ||  || — || May 29, 2008 || Kitt Peak || Spacewatch ||  || align=right | 3.5 km || 
|-id=615 bgcolor=#d6d6d6
| 588615 ||  || — || May 3, 2008 || Mount Lemmon || Mount Lemmon Survey ||  || align=right | 2.4 km || 
|-id=616 bgcolor=#d6d6d6
| 588616 ||  || — || May 31, 2008 || Kitt Peak || Spacewatch ||  || align=right | 3.5 km || 
|-id=617 bgcolor=#d6d6d6
| 588617 ||  || — || May 31, 2008 || Kitt Peak || Spacewatch ||  || align=right | 3.1 km || 
|-id=618 bgcolor=#E9E9E9
| 588618 ||  || — || October 14, 2013 || Mount Lemmon || Mount Lemmon Survey ||  || align=right data-sort-value="0.87" | 870 m || 
|-id=619 bgcolor=#d6d6d6
| 588619 ||  || — || September 28, 2009 || Catalina || CSS ||  || align=right | 3.0 km || 
|-id=620 bgcolor=#d6d6d6
| 588620 ||  || — || February 24, 2012 || Mount Lemmon || Mount Lemmon Survey ||  || align=right | 2.1 km || 
|-id=621 bgcolor=#d6d6d6
| 588621 ||  || — || November 8, 2010 || Mount Lemmon || Mount Lemmon Survey ||  || align=right | 2.7 km || 
|-id=622 bgcolor=#d6d6d6
| 588622 ||  || — || January 17, 2018 || Haleakala || Pan-STARRS ||  || align=right | 2.5 km || 
|-id=623 bgcolor=#d6d6d6
| 588623 ||  || — || January 26, 2012 || Haleakala || Pan-STARRS ||  || align=right | 2.4 km || 
|-id=624 bgcolor=#d6d6d6
| 588624 ||  || — || December 3, 2010 || Mount Lemmon || Mount Lemmon Survey ||  || align=right | 2.8 km || 
|-id=625 bgcolor=#E9E9E9
| 588625 ||  || — || May 12, 2012 || Mount Lemmon || Mount Lemmon Survey ||  || align=right data-sort-value="0.71" | 710 m || 
|-id=626 bgcolor=#d6d6d6
| 588626 ||  || — || September 8, 2015 || Haleakala || Pan-STARRS ||  || align=right | 2.5 km || 
|-id=627 bgcolor=#d6d6d6
| 588627 ||  || — || May 27, 2008 || Kitt Peak || Spacewatch ||  || align=right | 2.5 km || 
|-id=628 bgcolor=#d6d6d6
| 588628 ||  || — || April 28, 2008 || Mount Lemmon || Mount Lemmon Survey ||  || align=right | 2.6 km || 
|-id=629 bgcolor=#FA8072
| 588629 ||  || — || June 3, 2008 || Kitt Peak || Spacewatch || H || align=right data-sort-value="0.43" | 430 m || 
|-id=630 bgcolor=#d6d6d6
| 588630 ||  || — || June 3, 2008 || Kitt Peak || Spacewatch ||  || align=right | 2.5 km || 
|-id=631 bgcolor=#C2FFFF
| 588631 ||  || — || April 5, 2008 || Kitt Peak || Spacewatch || L5 || align=right | 8.7 km || 
|-id=632 bgcolor=#E9E9E9
| 588632 ||  || — || October 13, 2013 || Kitt Peak || Spacewatch ||  || align=right data-sort-value="0.68" | 680 m || 
|-id=633 bgcolor=#d6d6d6
| 588633 ||  || — || January 19, 2012 || Kitt Peak || Spacewatch ||  || align=right | 3.4 km || 
|-id=634 bgcolor=#E9E9E9
| 588634 ||  || — || June 6, 2008 || Kitt Peak || Spacewatch ||  || align=right | 1.1 km || 
|-id=635 bgcolor=#d6d6d6
| 588635 ||  || — || August 27, 2003 || Palomar || NEAT ||  || align=right | 4.0 km || 
|-id=636 bgcolor=#E9E9E9
| 588636 ||  || — || July 30, 2008 || Mount Lemmon || Mount Lemmon Survey ||  || align=right data-sort-value="0.91" | 910 m || 
|-id=637 bgcolor=#E9E9E9
| 588637 ||  || — || July 28, 2008 || Mount Lemmon || Mount Lemmon Survey ||  || align=right data-sort-value="0.82" | 820 m || 
|-id=638 bgcolor=#C2FFFF
| 588638 ||  || — || February 6, 2002 || Kitt Peak || R. Millis, M. W. Buie || L4006 || align=right | 8.0 km || 
|-id=639 bgcolor=#E9E9E9
| 588639 ||  || — || October 14, 2013 || Kitt Peak || Spacewatch ||  || align=right data-sort-value="0.93" | 930 m || 
|-id=640 bgcolor=#E9E9E9
| 588640 ||  || — || January 28, 2015 || Haleakala || Pan-STARRS ||  || align=right | 1.1 km || 
|-id=641 bgcolor=#C2FFFF
| 588641 ||  || — || February 9, 2014 || Kitt Peak || Spacewatch || L4 || align=right | 7.2 km || 
|-id=642 bgcolor=#E9E9E9
| 588642 ||  || — || January 31, 2015 || Haleakala || Pan-STARRS ||  || align=right | 1.0 km || 
|-id=643 bgcolor=#E9E9E9
| 588643 ||  || — || July 29, 2008 || Mount Lemmon || Mount Lemmon Survey ||  || align=right | 1.1 km || 
|-id=644 bgcolor=#C2FFFF
| 588644 ||  || — || July 29, 2008 || Kitt Peak || Spacewatch || L4 || align=right | 7.4 km || 
|-id=645 bgcolor=#E9E9E9
| 588645 ||  || — || August 3, 2008 || Dauban || F. Kugel ||  || align=right | 1.2 km || 
|-id=646 bgcolor=#E9E9E9
| 588646 ||  || — || August 10, 2008 || La Sagra || OAM Obs. ||  || align=right | 1.1 km || 
|-id=647 bgcolor=#C2FFFF
| 588647 ||  || — || August 7, 2008 || Kitt Peak || Spacewatch || L4 || align=right | 5.7 km || 
|-id=648 bgcolor=#E9E9E9
| 588648 ||  || — || February 16, 2015 || Haleakala || Pan-STARRS ||  || align=right | 1.1 km || 
|-id=649 bgcolor=#d6d6d6
| 588649 ||  || — || August 7, 2008 || Kitt Peak || Spacewatch || 7:4 || align=right | 2.4 km || 
|-id=650 bgcolor=#d6d6d6
| 588650 ||  || — || August 11, 2008 || Charleston || R. Holmes || 7:4 || align=right | 2.7 km || 
|-id=651 bgcolor=#E9E9E9
| 588651 ||  || — || August 7, 2008 || Kitt Peak || Spacewatch ||  || align=right | 1.3 km || 
|-id=652 bgcolor=#E9E9E9
| 588652 ||  || — || August 23, 2008 || Wildberg || R. Apitzsch ||  || align=right | 1.4 km || 
|-id=653 bgcolor=#E9E9E9
| 588653 ||  || — || August 26, 2008 || La Sagra || OAM Obs. ||  || align=right | 1.6 km || 
|-id=654 bgcolor=#E9E9E9
| 588654 ||  || — || August 26, 2008 || Socorro || LINEAR ||  || align=right | 1.3 km || 
|-id=655 bgcolor=#E9E9E9
| 588655 ||  || — || November 10, 2004 || Kitt Peak || Spacewatch ||  || align=right | 1.4 km || 
|-id=656 bgcolor=#C2FFFF
| 588656 ||  || — || August 26, 2008 || Piszkesteto || K. Sárneczky || L4 || align=right | 7.7 km || 
|-id=657 bgcolor=#FA8072
| 588657 ||  || — || August 31, 2008 || Bergisch Gladbach || W. Bickel || H || align=right data-sort-value="0.61" | 610 m || 
|-id=658 bgcolor=#fefefe
| 588658 ||  || — || August 27, 2008 || Crni Vrh || B. Mikuž || H || align=right data-sort-value="0.92" | 920 m || 
|-id=659 bgcolor=#E9E9E9
| 588659 ||  || — || June 14, 2012 || Haleakala || Pan-STARRS ||  || align=right | 1.7 km || 
|-id=660 bgcolor=#E9E9E9
| 588660 ||  || — || September 3, 2008 || Kitt Peak || Spacewatch ||  || align=right | 1.2 km || 
|-id=661 bgcolor=#d6d6d6
| 588661 ||  || — || August 20, 2008 || Kitt Peak || Spacewatch ||  || align=right | 3.1 km || 
|-id=662 bgcolor=#E9E9E9
| 588662 ||  || — || August 24, 2008 || Kitt Peak || Spacewatch ||  || align=right | 1.6 km || 
|-id=663 bgcolor=#C2FFFF
| 588663 ||  || — || September 4, 2008 || Kitt Peak || Spacewatch || L4 || align=right | 7.1 km || 
|-id=664 bgcolor=#E9E9E9
| 588664 ||  || — || August 24, 2008 || Kitt Peak || Spacewatch ||  || align=right | 2.1 km || 
|-id=665 bgcolor=#E9E9E9
| 588665 ||  || — || September 4, 2008 || Kitt Peak || Spacewatch ||  || align=right | 1.2 km || 
|-id=666 bgcolor=#E9E9E9
| 588666 ||  || — || July 29, 2008 || Mount Lemmon || Mount Lemmon Survey ||  || align=right | 1.3 km || 
|-id=667 bgcolor=#d6d6d6
| 588667 ||  || — || October 1, 2003 || Kitt Peak || Spacewatch ||  || align=right | 2.7 km || 
|-id=668 bgcolor=#C2FFFF
| 588668 ||  || — || September 4, 2008 || Kitt Peak || Spacewatch || L4 || align=right | 5.6 km || 
|-id=669 bgcolor=#E9E9E9
| 588669 ||  || — || September 6, 2008 || Catalina || CSS ||  || align=right | 1.5 km || 
|-id=670 bgcolor=#E9E9E9
| 588670 ||  || — || September 4, 2008 || Kitt Peak || Spacewatch ||  || align=right data-sort-value="0.80" | 800 m || 
|-id=671 bgcolor=#fefefe
| 588671 ||  || — || February 25, 2007 || Mount Lemmon || Mount Lemmon Survey ||  || align=right data-sort-value="0.51" | 510 m || 
|-id=672 bgcolor=#E9E9E9
| 588672 ||  || — || September 6, 2008 || Kitt Peak || Spacewatch ||  || align=right | 1.2 km || 
|-id=673 bgcolor=#E9E9E9
| 588673 ||  || — || September 7, 2008 || Mount Lemmon || Mount Lemmon Survey ||  || align=right | 1.5 km || 
|-id=674 bgcolor=#E9E9E9
| 588674 ||  || — || September 3, 2008 || Kitt Peak || Spacewatch ||  || align=right | 1.2 km || 
|-id=675 bgcolor=#E9E9E9
| 588675 ||  || — || September 6, 2008 || Mount Lemmon || Mount Lemmon Survey ||  || align=right | 1.4 km || 
|-id=676 bgcolor=#C2FFFF
| 588676 ||  || — || September 3, 2008 || Kitt Peak || Spacewatch || L4 || align=right | 8.0 km || 
|-id=677 bgcolor=#C2FFFF
| 588677 ||  || — || July 29, 2008 || Kitt Peak || Spacewatch || L4 || align=right | 9.0 km || 
|-id=678 bgcolor=#C2FFFF
| 588678 ||  || — || September 7, 2008 || Mount Lemmon || Mount Lemmon Survey || L4 || align=right | 9.7 km || 
|-id=679 bgcolor=#C2FFFF
| 588679 ||  || — || September 9, 2008 || Kitt Peak || Spacewatch || L4 || align=right | 6.9 km || 
|-id=680 bgcolor=#E9E9E9
| 588680 ||  || — || September 3, 2008 || Kitt Peak || Spacewatch ||  || align=right | 1.2 km || 
|-id=681 bgcolor=#E9E9E9
| 588681 ||  || — || September 4, 2008 || Kitt Peak || Spacewatch ||  || align=right | 1.2 km || 
|-id=682 bgcolor=#fefefe
| 588682 ||  || — || September 4, 2008 || Kitt Peak || Spacewatch ||  || align=right data-sort-value="0.45" | 450 m || 
|-id=683 bgcolor=#E9E9E9
| 588683 ||  || — || September 9, 2008 || Mount Lemmon || Mount Lemmon Survey ||  || align=right | 1.4 km || 
|-id=684 bgcolor=#fefefe
| 588684 ||  || — || February 7, 2011 || Mount Lemmon || Mount Lemmon Survey ||  || align=right data-sort-value="0.62" | 620 m || 
|-id=685 bgcolor=#E9E9E9
| 588685 ||  || — || September 5, 2008 || Kitt Peak || Spacewatch ||  || align=right | 1.2 km || 
|-id=686 bgcolor=#E9E9E9
| 588686 ||  || — || September 6, 2008 || Mount Lemmon || Mount Lemmon Survey ||  || align=right | 1.3 km || 
|-id=687 bgcolor=#E9E9E9
| 588687 ||  || — || September 9, 2008 || Kitt Peak || Spacewatch ||  || align=right | 1.7 km || 
|-id=688 bgcolor=#E9E9E9
| 588688 ||  || — || September 3, 2008 || Kitt Peak || Spacewatch ||  || align=right | 1.3 km || 
|-id=689 bgcolor=#E9E9E9
| 588689 ||  || — || September 7, 2008 || Mount Lemmon || Mount Lemmon Survey ||  || align=right | 1.1 km || 
|-id=690 bgcolor=#E9E9E9
| 588690 ||  || — || September 3, 2008 || Kitt Peak || Spacewatch ||  || align=right | 1.2 km || 
|-id=691 bgcolor=#C2FFFF
| 588691 ||  || — || September 3, 2008 || Kitt Peak || Spacewatch || L4 || align=right | 7.4 km || 
|-id=692 bgcolor=#fefefe
| 588692 ||  || — || September 3, 2008 || Kitt Peak || Spacewatch ||  || align=right data-sort-value="0.62" | 620 m || 
|-id=693 bgcolor=#C2FFFF
| 588693 ||  || — || October 22, 2009 || Mount Lemmon || Mount Lemmon Survey || L4 || align=right | 6.1 km || 
|-id=694 bgcolor=#C2FFFF
| 588694 ||  || — || July 29, 2008 || Mount Lemmon || Mount Lemmon Survey || L4 || align=right | 7.1 km || 
|-id=695 bgcolor=#E9E9E9
| 588695 ||  || — || September 5, 2008 || Kitt Peak || Spacewatch ||  || align=right | 1.4 km || 
|-id=696 bgcolor=#d6d6d6
| 588696 ||  || — || September 5, 2008 || Kitt Peak || Spacewatch ||  || align=right | 2.4 km || 
|-id=697 bgcolor=#C2FFFF
| 588697 ||  || — || September 10, 2008 || Kitt Peak || Spacewatch || L4 || align=right | 6.4 km || 
|-id=698 bgcolor=#C2FFFF
| 588698 ||  || — || September 5, 2008 || Kitt Peak || Spacewatch || L4 || align=right | 7.2 km || 
|-id=699 bgcolor=#E9E9E9
| 588699 ||  || — || September 6, 2008 || Siding Spring || SSS ||  || align=right | 1.6 km || 
|-id=700 bgcolor=#C2FFFF
| 588700 ||  || — || September 7, 2008 || Mount Lemmon || Mount Lemmon Survey || L4 || align=right | 7.0 km || 
|}

588701–588800 

|-bgcolor=#E9E9E9
| 588701 ||  || — || September 6, 2008 || Mount Lemmon || Mount Lemmon Survey ||  || align=right | 1.1 km || 
|-id=702 bgcolor=#C2FFFF
| 588702 ||  || — || September 3, 2008 || Kitt Peak || Spacewatch || L4 || align=right | 8.2 km || 
|-id=703 bgcolor=#d6d6d6
| 588703 ||  || — || September 4, 2008 || Kitt Peak || Spacewatch || 7:4 || align=right | 2.7 km || 
|-id=704 bgcolor=#E9E9E9
| 588704 ||  || — || September 6, 2008 || Kitt Peak || Spacewatch ||  || align=right | 1.3 km || 
|-id=705 bgcolor=#E9E9E9
| 588705 ||  || — || November 11, 2004 || Kitt Peak || Spacewatch ||  || align=right | 1.4 km || 
|-id=706 bgcolor=#E9E9E9
| 588706 ||  || — || September 21, 2008 || Mount Lemmon || Mount Lemmon Survey ||  || align=right | 1.5 km || 
|-id=707 bgcolor=#fefefe
| 588707 ||  || — || September 29, 2005 || Mount Lemmon || Mount Lemmon Survey ||  || align=right data-sort-value="0.50" | 500 m || 
|-id=708 bgcolor=#C2FFFF
| 588708 ||  || — || April 9, 2003 || Kitt Peak || Spacewatch || L4 || align=right | 7.8 km || 
|-id=709 bgcolor=#fefefe
| 588709 ||  || — || September 6, 2008 || Kitt Peak || Spacewatch ||  || align=right data-sort-value="0.59" | 590 m || 
|-id=710 bgcolor=#E9E9E9
| 588710 ||  || — || September 20, 2008 || Kitt Peak || Spacewatch || EUN || align=right | 1.0 km || 
|-id=711 bgcolor=#E9E9E9
| 588711 ||  || — || January 5, 2006 || Kitt Peak || Spacewatch ||  || align=right | 1.2 km || 
|-id=712 bgcolor=#E9E9E9
| 588712 ||  || — || September 20, 2008 || Kitt Peak || Spacewatch ||  || align=right | 1.4 km || 
|-id=713 bgcolor=#E9E9E9
| 588713 ||  || — || September 21, 2008 || Kitt Peak || Spacewatch ||  || align=right data-sort-value="0.74" | 740 m || 
|-id=714 bgcolor=#fefefe
| 588714 ||  || — || September 21, 2008 || Mount Lemmon || Mount Lemmon Survey ||  || align=right data-sort-value="0.51" | 510 m || 
|-id=715 bgcolor=#E9E9E9
| 588715 ||  || — || September 20, 2008 || Catalina || CSS ||  || align=right | 1.7 km || 
|-id=716 bgcolor=#fefefe
| 588716 ||  || — || August 10, 2004 || Campo Imperatore || A. Boattini, F. De Luise ||  || align=right data-sort-value="0.56" | 560 m || 
|-id=717 bgcolor=#fefefe
| 588717 ||  || — || September 21, 2008 || Kitt Peak || Spacewatch ||  || align=right data-sort-value="0.55" | 550 m || 
|-id=718 bgcolor=#d6d6d6
| 588718 ||  || — || May 4, 2006 || Kitt Peak || Spacewatch ||  || align=right | 2.9 km || 
|-id=719 bgcolor=#E9E9E9
| 588719 ||  || — || September 7, 2008 || Mount Lemmon || Mount Lemmon Survey ||  || align=right data-sort-value="0.95" | 950 m || 
|-id=720 bgcolor=#d6d6d6
| 588720 ||  || — || September 22, 2008 || Mount Lemmon || Mount Lemmon Survey ||  || align=right | 2.1 km || 
|-id=721 bgcolor=#C2FFFF
| 588721 ||  || — || September 23, 2008 || Mount Lemmon || Mount Lemmon Survey || L4 || align=right | 6.8 km || 
|-id=722 bgcolor=#E9E9E9
| 588722 ||  || — || September 24, 2008 || Mount Lemmon || Mount Lemmon Survey ||  || align=right | 1.2 km || 
|-id=723 bgcolor=#E9E9E9
| 588723 ||  || — || January 8, 2006 || Mount Lemmon || Mount Lemmon Survey ||  || align=right | 1.3 km || 
|-id=724 bgcolor=#C2FFFF
| 588724 ||  || — || September 23, 2008 || Kitt Peak || Spacewatch || L4 || align=right | 8.7 km || 
|-id=725 bgcolor=#E9E9E9
| 588725 ||  || — || April 24, 2007 || Kitt Peak || Spacewatch ||  || align=right | 1.9 km || 
|-id=726 bgcolor=#E9E9E9
| 588726 ||  || — || September 24, 2008 || Mount Lemmon || Mount Lemmon Survey ||  || align=right | 1.2 km || 
|-id=727 bgcolor=#E9E9E9
| 588727 ||  || — || September 25, 2008 || Mount Lemmon || Mount Lemmon Survey ||  || align=right | 1.2 km || 
|-id=728 bgcolor=#C2FFFF
| 588728 ||  || — || September 27, 2008 || Mount Lemmon || Mount Lemmon Survey || L4 || align=right | 7.8 km || 
|-id=729 bgcolor=#E9E9E9
| 588729 ||  || — || September 28, 2008 || Mount Lemmon || Mount Lemmon Survey ||  || align=right | 1.4 km || 
|-id=730 bgcolor=#fefefe
| 588730 ||  || — || September 9, 2008 || Bergisch Gladbach || W. Bickel ||  || align=right data-sort-value="0.72" | 720 m || 
|-id=731 bgcolor=#E9E9E9
| 588731 ||  || — || September 25, 2008 || Mount Lemmon || Mount Lemmon Survey ||  || align=right | 1.0 km || 
|-id=732 bgcolor=#E9E9E9
| 588732 ||  || — || September 5, 2008 || Kitt Peak || Spacewatch ||  || align=right data-sort-value="0.80" | 800 m || 
|-id=733 bgcolor=#C2FFFF
| 588733 ||  || — || September 28, 2008 || Mount Lemmon || Mount Lemmon Survey || L4 || align=right | 7.8 km || 
|-id=734 bgcolor=#E9E9E9
| 588734 ||  || — || September 28, 2008 || Mount Lemmon || Mount Lemmon Survey ||  || align=right | 1.0 km || 
|-id=735 bgcolor=#C2FFFF
| 588735 ||  || — || September 28, 2008 || Mount Lemmon || Mount Lemmon Survey || L4 || align=right | 6.4 km || 
|-id=736 bgcolor=#E9E9E9
| 588736 ||  || — || September 20, 2008 || Mount Lemmon || Mount Lemmon Survey ||  || align=right | 1.4 km || 
|-id=737 bgcolor=#fefefe
| 588737 ||  || — || September 25, 2008 || Kitt Peak || Spacewatch ||  || align=right data-sort-value="0.62" | 620 m || 
|-id=738 bgcolor=#C2FFFF
| 588738 ||  || — || September 3, 2008 || Kitt Peak || Spacewatch || L4 || align=right | 7.0 km || 
|-id=739 bgcolor=#E9E9E9
| 588739 ||  || — || September 23, 2008 || Kitt Peak || Spacewatch ||  || align=right | 1.5 km || 
|-id=740 bgcolor=#C2FFFF
| 588740 ||  || — || September 28, 2008 || Mount Lemmon || Mount Lemmon Survey || L4 || align=right | 7.8 km || 
|-id=741 bgcolor=#E9E9E9
| 588741 ||  || — || September 28, 2008 || Catalina || CSS ||  || align=right | 1.5 km || 
|-id=742 bgcolor=#E9E9E9
| 588742 ||  || — || September 23, 2008 || Catalina || CSS ||  || align=right | 1.3 km || 
|-id=743 bgcolor=#E9E9E9
| 588743 ||  || — || August 30, 2008 || Socorro || LINEAR ||  || align=right | 1.2 km || 
|-id=744 bgcolor=#E9E9E9
| 588744 ||  || — || September 29, 2008 || Mount Lemmon || Mount Lemmon Survey ||  || align=right | 1.3 km || 
|-id=745 bgcolor=#E9E9E9
| 588745 ||  || — || September 20, 2008 || Kitt Peak || Spacewatch ||  || align=right | 1.5 km || 
|-id=746 bgcolor=#E9E9E9
| 588746 ||  || — || September 23, 2008 || Kitt Peak || Spacewatch ||  || align=right | 1.9 km || 
|-id=747 bgcolor=#E9E9E9
| 588747 ||  || — || September 29, 2008 || Mount Lemmon || Mount Lemmon Survey ||  || align=right | 1.2 km || 
|-id=748 bgcolor=#E9E9E9
| 588748 ||  || — || September 24, 2008 || Mount Lemmon || Mount Lemmon Survey ||  || align=right | 1.2 km || 
|-id=749 bgcolor=#E9E9E9
| 588749 ||  || — || April 1, 2011 || Mount Lemmon || Mount Lemmon Survey ||  || align=right | 1.1 km || 
|-id=750 bgcolor=#C2FFFF
| 588750 ||  || — || January 2, 2012 || Mount Lemmon || Mount Lemmon Survey || L4 || align=right | 7.5 km || 
|-id=751 bgcolor=#E9E9E9
| 588751 ||  || — || September 21, 2008 || Mount Lemmon || Mount Lemmon Survey ||  || align=right | 1.5 km || 
|-id=752 bgcolor=#E9E9E9
| 588752 ||  || — || September 25, 2008 || Kitt Peak || Spacewatch ||  || align=right | 1.2 km || 
|-id=753 bgcolor=#C2FFFF
| 588753 ||  || — || September 25, 2008 || Kitt Peak || Spacewatch || L4 || align=right | 9.1 km || 
|-id=754 bgcolor=#E9E9E9
| 588754 ||  || — || January 21, 2015 || Haleakala || Pan-STARRS ||  || align=right | 1.2 km || 
|-id=755 bgcolor=#E9E9E9
| 588755 ||  || — || October 13, 2012 || Catalina || CSS ||  || align=right | 1.5 km || 
|-id=756 bgcolor=#E9E9E9
| 588756 ||  || — || September 23, 2008 || Mount Lemmon || Mount Lemmon Survey ||  || align=right | 1.5 km || 
|-id=757 bgcolor=#E9E9E9
| 588757 ||  || — || September 25, 2008 || Kitt Peak || Spacewatch ||  || align=right data-sort-value="0.97" | 970 m || 
|-id=758 bgcolor=#E9E9E9
| 588758 ||  || — || November 27, 2013 || Kitt Peak || Spacewatch ||  || align=right | 1.2 km || 
|-id=759 bgcolor=#E9E9E9
| 588759 ||  || — || September 28, 2008 || Mount Lemmon || Mount Lemmon Survey ||  || align=right | 1.1 km || 
|-id=760 bgcolor=#E9E9E9
| 588760 ||  || — || September 28, 2008 || Mount Lemmon || Mount Lemmon Survey ||  || align=right | 1.1 km || 
|-id=761 bgcolor=#C2FFFF
| 588761 ||  || — || September 24, 2008 || Mount Lemmon || Mount Lemmon Survey || L4 || align=right | 7.6 km || 
|-id=762 bgcolor=#E9E9E9
| 588762 ||  || — || September 24, 2008 || Kitt Peak || Spacewatch ||  || align=right data-sort-value="0.64" | 640 m || 
|-id=763 bgcolor=#C2FFFF
| 588763 ||  || — || September 23, 2008 || Kitt Peak || Spacewatch || L4 || align=right | 5.8 km || 
|-id=764 bgcolor=#fefefe
| 588764 ||  || — || October 1, 2008 || Catalina || CSS || H || align=right data-sort-value="0.67" | 670 m || 
|-id=765 bgcolor=#d6d6d6
| 588765 ||  || — || September 19, 2008 || Kitt Peak || Spacewatch ||  || align=right | 2.2 km || 
|-id=766 bgcolor=#C2FFFF
| 588766 ||  || — || October 1, 2008 || Mount Lemmon || Mount Lemmon Survey || L4 || align=right | 7.2 km || 
|-id=767 bgcolor=#fefefe
| 588767 ||  || — || October 2, 2008 || Kitt Peak || Spacewatch ||  || align=right data-sort-value="0.49" | 490 m || 
|-id=768 bgcolor=#fefefe
| 588768 ||  || — || October 2, 2008 || Kitt Peak || Spacewatch ||  || align=right data-sort-value="0.55" | 550 m || 
|-id=769 bgcolor=#E9E9E9
| 588769 ||  || — || October 2, 2008 || Kitt Peak || Spacewatch ||  || align=right data-sort-value="0.97" | 970 m || 
|-id=770 bgcolor=#fefefe
| 588770 ||  || — || October 3, 2008 || Mount Lemmon || Mount Lemmon Survey ||  || align=right data-sort-value="0.56" | 560 m || 
|-id=771 bgcolor=#E9E9E9
| 588771 ||  || — || September 23, 2008 || Goodricke-Pigott || R. A. Tucker ||  || align=right | 1.6 km || 
|-id=772 bgcolor=#E9E9E9
| 588772 ||  || — || October 6, 2008 || Mount Lemmon || Mount Lemmon Survey ||  || align=right | 1.6 km || 
|-id=773 bgcolor=#fefefe
| 588773 ||  || — || September 29, 2008 || Catalina || CSS ||  || align=right data-sort-value="0.52" | 520 m || 
|-id=774 bgcolor=#E9E9E9
| 588774 ||  || — || September 2, 2008 || Kitt Peak || Spacewatch ||  || align=right | 1.3 km || 
|-id=775 bgcolor=#E9E9E9
| 588775 ||  || — || March 2, 2006 || Kitt Peak || Spacewatch ||  || align=right | 1.3 km || 
|-id=776 bgcolor=#fefefe
| 588776 ||  || — || October 9, 2008 || Mount Lemmon || Mount Lemmon Survey ||  || align=right data-sort-value="0.68" | 680 m || 
|-id=777 bgcolor=#d6d6d6
| 588777 ||  || — || November 20, 2003 || Kitt Peak || Spacewatch ||  || align=right | 2.8 km || 
|-id=778 bgcolor=#E9E9E9
| 588778 ||  || — || October 2, 2008 || Kitt Peak || Spacewatch ||  || align=right | 1.4 km || 
|-id=779 bgcolor=#E9E9E9
| 588779 ||  || — || October 8, 2008 || Kitt Peak || Spacewatch ||  || align=right | 1.2 km || 
|-id=780 bgcolor=#E9E9E9
| 588780 ||  || — || October 7, 2008 || Kitt Peak || Spacewatch ||  || align=right | 1.8 km || 
|-id=781 bgcolor=#C2FFFF
| 588781 ||  || — || December 28, 2011 || Kitt Peak || Spacewatch || L4 || align=right | 7.7 km || 
|-id=782 bgcolor=#E9E9E9
| 588782 ||  || — || October 6, 2008 || Mount Lemmon || Mount Lemmon Survey ||  || align=right | 1.4 km || 
|-id=783 bgcolor=#E9E9E9
| 588783 ||  || — || October 6, 2008 || Kitt Peak || Spacewatch ||  || align=right | 1.5 km || 
|-id=784 bgcolor=#d6d6d6
| 588784 ||  || — || September 6, 2008 || Kitt Peak || Spacewatch ||  || align=right | 2.3 km || 
|-id=785 bgcolor=#E9E9E9
| 588785 ||  || — || October 8, 2008 || Kitt Peak || Spacewatch ||  || align=right | 1.7 km || 
|-id=786 bgcolor=#E9E9E9
| 588786 ||  || — || December 4, 2013 || Haleakala || Pan-STARRS ||  || align=right | 1.5 km || 
|-id=787 bgcolor=#E9E9E9
| 588787 ||  || — || October 1, 2008 || Mount Lemmon || Mount Lemmon Survey ||  || align=right | 1.4 km || 
|-id=788 bgcolor=#fefefe
| 588788 ||  || — || October 1, 2008 || Mount Lemmon || Mount Lemmon Survey ||  || align=right | 1.1 km || 
|-id=789 bgcolor=#E9E9E9
| 588789 ||  || — || September 29, 2008 || Kitt Peak || Spacewatch ||  || align=right | 1.1 km || 
|-id=790 bgcolor=#E9E9E9
| 588790 ||  || — || October 2, 2008 || Mount Lemmon || Mount Lemmon Survey ||  || align=right | 1.1 km || 
|-id=791 bgcolor=#E9E9E9
| 588791 ||  || — || October 9, 2008 || Catalina || CSS ||  || align=right | 1.3 km || 
|-id=792 bgcolor=#E9E9E9
| 588792 ||  || — || October 22, 2017 || Mount Lemmon || Mount Lemmon Survey ||  || align=right | 1.5 km || 
|-id=793 bgcolor=#E9E9E9
| 588793 ||  || — || February 15, 2010 || Mount Lemmon || Mount Lemmon Survey ||  || align=right | 1.5 km || 
|-id=794 bgcolor=#fefefe
| 588794 ||  || — || January 1, 2014 || Mount Lemmon || Mount Lemmon Survey ||  || align=right data-sort-value="0.74" | 740 m || 
|-id=795 bgcolor=#fefefe
| 588795 ||  || — || October 10, 2008 || Kitt Peak || Spacewatch ||  || align=right data-sort-value="0.51" | 510 m || 
|-id=796 bgcolor=#C2FFFF
| 588796 ||  || — || November 1, 2010 || Kitt Peak || Spacewatch || L4 || align=right | 6.3 km || 
|-id=797 bgcolor=#d6d6d6
| 588797 ||  || — || October 8, 2008 || Kitt Peak || Spacewatch ||  || align=right | 1.9 km || 
|-id=798 bgcolor=#E9E9E9
| 588798 ||  || — || October 9, 2008 || Mount Lemmon || Mount Lemmon Survey ||  || align=right | 1.3 km || 
|-id=799 bgcolor=#E9E9E9
| 588799 ||  || — || October 1, 2008 || Mount Lemmon || Mount Lemmon Survey ||  || align=right | 2.0 km || 
|-id=800 bgcolor=#fefefe
| 588800 ||  || — || October 10, 2008 || Kitt Peak || Spacewatch ||  || align=right data-sort-value="0.64" | 640 m || 
|}

588801–588900 

|-bgcolor=#E9E9E9
| 588801 ||  || — || October 7, 2008 || Mount Lemmon || Mount Lemmon Survey ||  || align=right | 1.8 km || 
|-id=802 bgcolor=#C2FFFF
| 588802 ||  || — || October 18, 2008 || Auberry || P. Mortfield || L4 || align=right | 7.4 km || 
|-id=803 bgcolor=#d6d6d6
| 588803 ||  || — || October 20, 2003 || Kitt Peak || Spacewatch ||  || align=right | 1.7 km || 
|-id=804 bgcolor=#d6d6d6
| 588804 ||  || — || October 18, 2008 || Kitt Peak || Spacewatch ||  || align=right | 3.0 km || 
|-id=805 bgcolor=#E9E9E9
| 588805 ||  || — || October 7, 2004 || Kitt Peak || Spacewatch ||  || align=right | 1.3 km || 
|-id=806 bgcolor=#E9E9E9
| 588806 ||  || — || January 30, 2006 || Kitt Peak || Spacewatch ||  || align=right | 1.3 km || 
|-id=807 bgcolor=#E9E9E9
| 588807 ||  || — || October 20, 2008 || Mount Lemmon || Mount Lemmon Survey ||  || align=right | 1.7 km || 
|-id=808 bgcolor=#fefefe
| 588808 ||  || — || October 20, 2008 || Kitt Peak || Spacewatch || H || align=right data-sort-value="0.66" | 660 m || 
|-id=809 bgcolor=#E9E9E9
| 588809 ||  || — || January 23, 2006 || Kitt Peak || Spacewatch ||  || align=right | 1.4 km || 
|-id=810 bgcolor=#E9E9E9
| 588810 ||  || — || April 30, 2006 || Kitt Peak || Spacewatch ||  || align=right | 1.9 km || 
|-id=811 bgcolor=#d6d6d6
| 588811 ||  || — || September 24, 2008 || Kitt Peak || Spacewatch || 7:4 || align=right | 3.1 km || 
|-id=812 bgcolor=#E9E9E9
| 588812 ||  || — || October 21, 2008 || Kitt Peak || Spacewatch ||  || align=right | 2.1 km || 
|-id=813 bgcolor=#E9E9E9
| 588813 ||  || — || October 23, 2008 || Kitt Peak || Spacewatch ||  || align=right | 1.2 km || 
|-id=814 bgcolor=#E9E9E9
| 588814 ||  || — || October 23, 2008 || Mount Lemmon || Mount Lemmon Survey ||  || align=right | 1.6 km || 
|-id=815 bgcolor=#E9E9E9
| 588815 ||  || — || October 1, 2008 || Catalina || CSS ||  || align=right | 1.3 km || 
|-id=816 bgcolor=#E9E9E9
| 588816 ||  || — || October 6, 2008 || Kitt Peak || Spacewatch ||  || align=right | 1.3 km || 
|-id=817 bgcolor=#E9E9E9
| 588817 ||  || — || October 21, 2008 || Mount Lemmon || Mount Lemmon Survey ||  || align=right | 1.3 km || 
|-id=818 bgcolor=#fefefe
| 588818 ||  || — || October 22, 2008 || Kitt Peak || Spacewatch ||  || align=right data-sort-value="0.61" | 610 m || 
|-id=819 bgcolor=#fefefe
| 588819 ||  || — || October 22, 2008 || Kitt Peak || Spacewatch ||  || align=right data-sort-value="0.52" | 520 m || 
|-id=820 bgcolor=#E9E9E9
| 588820 ||  || — || October 22, 2008 || Kitt Peak || Spacewatch ||  || align=right | 1.3 km || 
|-id=821 bgcolor=#E9E9E9
| 588821 ||  || — || July 7, 2003 || Kitt Peak || Spacewatch ||  || align=right | 1.3 km || 
|-id=822 bgcolor=#E9E9E9
| 588822 ||  || — || October 22, 2008 || Kitt Peak || Spacewatch ||  || align=right | 1.8 km || 
|-id=823 bgcolor=#E9E9E9
| 588823 ||  || — || October 22, 2008 || Kitt Peak || Spacewatch ||  || align=right | 1.6 km || 
|-id=824 bgcolor=#E9E9E9
| 588824 ||  || — || October 23, 2008 || Kitt Peak || Spacewatch ||  || align=right | 1.4 km || 
|-id=825 bgcolor=#E9E9E9
| 588825 ||  || — || October 23, 2008 || Kitt Peak || Spacewatch ||  || align=right | 2.4 km || 
|-id=826 bgcolor=#E9E9E9
| 588826 ||  || — || October 24, 2008 || Kitt Peak || Spacewatch ||  || align=right | 2.1 km || 
|-id=827 bgcolor=#E9E9E9
| 588827 ||  || — || October 24, 2008 || Kitt Peak || Spacewatch ||  || align=right | 1.7 km || 
|-id=828 bgcolor=#fefefe
| 588828 ||  || — || October 24, 2008 || Mount Lemmon || Mount Lemmon Survey ||  || align=right data-sort-value="0.56" | 560 m || 
|-id=829 bgcolor=#E9E9E9
| 588829 ||  || — || October 24, 2008 || Mount Lemmon || Mount Lemmon Survey ||  || align=right | 1.2 km || 
|-id=830 bgcolor=#E9E9E9
| 588830 ||  || — || October 25, 2008 || Kitt Peak || Spacewatch ||  || align=right | 1.1 km || 
|-id=831 bgcolor=#E9E9E9
| 588831 ||  || — || October 26, 2008 || Mount Lemmon || Mount Lemmon Survey ||  || align=right | 2.1 km || 
|-id=832 bgcolor=#E9E9E9
| 588832 ||  || — || September 30, 2008 || Catalina || CSS ||  || align=right | 1.2 km || 
|-id=833 bgcolor=#E9E9E9
| 588833 ||  || — || December 2, 2005 || Mauna Kea || Mauna Kea Obs. ||  || align=right | 1.7 km || 
|-id=834 bgcolor=#E9E9E9
| 588834 ||  || — || October 24, 2008 || Catalina || CSS ||  || align=right | 1.4 km || 
|-id=835 bgcolor=#E9E9E9
| 588835 ||  || — || September 18, 2003 || Kitt Peak || Spacewatch ||  || align=right | 1.7 km || 
|-id=836 bgcolor=#E9E9E9
| 588836 ||  || — || October 25, 2008 || Kitt Peak || Spacewatch ||  || align=right | 1.7 km || 
|-id=837 bgcolor=#C2FFFF
| 588837 ||  || — || October 8, 2008 || Mount Lemmon || Mount Lemmon Survey || L4 || align=right | 6.5 km || 
|-id=838 bgcolor=#fefefe
| 588838 ||  || — || October 9, 2008 || Kitt Peak || Spacewatch ||  || align=right data-sort-value="0.50" | 500 m || 
|-id=839 bgcolor=#fefefe
| 588839 ||  || — || October 26, 2008 || Kitt Peak || Spacewatch ||  || align=right data-sort-value="0.61" | 610 m || 
|-id=840 bgcolor=#fefefe
| 588840 ||  || — || October 26, 2008 || Kitt Peak || Spacewatch ||  || align=right data-sort-value="0.55" | 550 m || 
|-id=841 bgcolor=#E9E9E9
| 588841 ||  || — || October 9, 2008 || Catalina || CSS ||  || align=right | 1.4 km || 
|-id=842 bgcolor=#E9E9E9
| 588842 ||  || — || October 27, 2008 || Mount Lemmon || Mount Lemmon Survey ||  || align=right | 1.3 km || 
|-id=843 bgcolor=#E9E9E9
| 588843 ||  || — || October 28, 2008 || Kitt Peak || Spacewatch ||  || align=right | 1.3 km || 
|-id=844 bgcolor=#E9E9E9
| 588844 ||  || — || March 26, 2006 || Kitt Peak || Spacewatch ||  || align=right | 1.2 km || 
|-id=845 bgcolor=#E9E9E9
| 588845 ||  || — || October 2, 2008 || Mount Lemmon || Mount Lemmon Survey ||  || align=right | 1.5 km || 
|-id=846 bgcolor=#E9E9E9
| 588846 ||  || — || October 28, 2008 || Kitt Peak || Spacewatch ||  || align=right | 1.6 km || 
|-id=847 bgcolor=#E9E9E9
| 588847 ||  || — || February 2, 2006 || Kitt Peak || Spacewatch ||  || align=right | 1.3 km || 
|-id=848 bgcolor=#E9E9E9
| 588848 ||  || — || October 28, 2008 || Mount Lemmon || Mount Lemmon Survey ||  || align=right | 1.8 km || 
|-id=849 bgcolor=#E9E9E9
| 588849 ||  || — || October 29, 2008 || Kitt Peak || Spacewatch ||  || align=right | 1.9 km || 
|-id=850 bgcolor=#fefefe
| 588850 ||  || — || October 30, 2008 || Kitt Peak || Spacewatch ||  || align=right data-sort-value="0.70" | 700 m || 
|-id=851 bgcolor=#E9E9E9
| 588851 ||  || — || October 30, 2008 || Kitt Peak || Spacewatch ||  || align=right | 2.0 km || 
|-id=852 bgcolor=#fefefe
| 588852 ||  || — || September 29, 2008 || Mount Lemmon || Mount Lemmon Survey ||  || align=right data-sort-value="0.49" | 490 m || 
|-id=853 bgcolor=#E9E9E9
| 588853 ||  || — || October 31, 2008 || Mount Lemmon || Mount Lemmon Survey ||  || align=right | 1.8 km || 
|-id=854 bgcolor=#fefefe
| 588854 ||  || — || October 31, 2008 || Mount Lemmon || Mount Lemmon Survey ||  || align=right data-sort-value="0.49" | 490 m || 
|-id=855 bgcolor=#E9E9E9
| 588855 ||  || — || April 18, 2015 || Haleakala || Pan-STARRS ||  || align=right | 2.3 km || 
|-id=856 bgcolor=#E9E9E9
| 588856 ||  || — || October 27, 2008 || Kitt Peak || Spacewatch ||  || align=right | 1.7 km || 
|-id=857 bgcolor=#E9E9E9
| 588857 ||  || — || May 5, 2006 || Mount Lemmon || Mount Lemmon Survey ||  || align=right | 1.7 km || 
|-id=858 bgcolor=#E9E9E9
| 588858 ||  || — || October 2, 2008 || Kitt Peak || Spacewatch ||  || align=right | 1.2 km || 
|-id=859 bgcolor=#E9E9E9
| 588859 ||  || — || February 1, 2005 || Kitt Peak || Spacewatch ||  || align=right | 1.7 km || 
|-id=860 bgcolor=#E9E9E9
| 588860 ||  || — || October 1, 2008 || Catalina || CSS ||  || align=right | 1.4 km || 
|-id=861 bgcolor=#C2FFFF
| 588861 ||  || — || December 17, 1999 || Kitt Peak || Spacewatch || L4 || align=right | 9.8 km || 
|-id=862 bgcolor=#E9E9E9
| 588862 ||  || — || October 21, 2008 || Mount Lemmon || Mount Lemmon Survey ||  || align=right | 2.1 km || 
|-id=863 bgcolor=#E9E9E9
| 588863 ||  || — || October 30, 2008 || Mount Lemmon || Mount Lemmon Survey ||  || align=right | 1.6 km || 
|-id=864 bgcolor=#E9E9E9
| 588864 ||  || — || March 22, 2015 || Haleakala || Pan-STARRS ||  || align=right | 1.2 km || 
|-id=865 bgcolor=#E9E9E9
| 588865 ||  || — || April 29, 2011 || Mount Lemmon || Mount Lemmon Survey ||  || align=right | 1.2 km || 
|-id=866 bgcolor=#E9E9E9
| 588866 ||  || — || May 29, 2012 || Mount Lemmon || Mount Lemmon Survey ||  || align=right | 1.2 km || 
|-id=867 bgcolor=#E9E9E9
| 588867 ||  || — || May 8, 2011 || Mount Lemmon || Mount Lemmon Survey ||  || align=right | 1.4 km || 
|-id=868 bgcolor=#E9E9E9
| 588868 ||  || — || October 24, 2008 || Kitt Peak || Spacewatch ||  || align=right | 1.1 km || 
|-id=869 bgcolor=#E9E9E9
| 588869 ||  || — || April 6, 2011 || Mount Lemmon || Mount Lemmon Survey ||  || align=right data-sort-value="0.84" | 840 m || 
|-id=870 bgcolor=#E9E9E9
| 588870 ||  || — || October 27, 2008 || Mount Lemmon || Mount Lemmon Survey ||  || align=right | 1.2 km || 
|-id=871 bgcolor=#fefefe
| 588871 ||  || — || March 20, 2010 || Siding Spring || SSS ||  || align=right data-sort-value="0.76" | 760 m || 
|-id=872 bgcolor=#d6d6d6
| 588872 ||  || — || March 28, 2011 || Mount Lemmon || Mount Lemmon Survey || 7:4 || align=right | 3.0 km || 
|-id=873 bgcolor=#E9E9E9
| 588873 ||  || — || September 26, 2017 || Haleakala || Pan-STARRS ||  || align=right | 1.5 km || 
|-id=874 bgcolor=#E9E9E9
| 588874 ||  || — || October 26, 2008 || Mount Lemmon || Mount Lemmon Survey ||  || align=right | 1.1 km || 
|-id=875 bgcolor=#E9E9E9
| 588875 ||  || — || September 26, 2017 || Haleakala || Pan-STARRS ||  || align=right | 1.6 km || 
|-id=876 bgcolor=#fefefe
| 588876 ||  || — || September 23, 2008 || Mount Lemmon || Mount Lemmon Survey ||  || align=right data-sort-value="0.62" | 620 m || 
|-id=877 bgcolor=#E9E9E9
| 588877 ||  || — || October 24, 2008 || Kitt Peak || Spacewatch ||  || align=right | 1.2 km || 
|-id=878 bgcolor=#E9E9E9
| 588878 ||  || — || August 17, 2012 || Haleakala || Pan-STARRS ||  || align=right | 1.5 km || 
|-id=879 bgcolor=#E9E9E9
| 588879 ||  || — || October 18, 2017 || Haleakala || Pan-STARRS ||  || align=right | 1.2 km || 
|-id=880 bgcolor=#E9E9E9
| 588880 ||  || — || September 30, 2017 || Haleakala || Pan-STARRS ||  || align=right | 2.1 km || 
|-id=881 bgcolor=#E9E9E9
| 588881 ||  || — || February 15, 2015 || Haleakala || Pan-STARRS ||  || align=right | 1.8 km || 
|-id=882 bgcolor=#E9E9E9
| 588882 ||  || — || January 20, 2015 || Haleakala || Pan-STARRS ||  || align=right | 1.5 km || 
|-id=883 bgcolor=#E9E9E9
| 588883 ||  || — || May 9, 2011 || Mount Lemmon || Mount Lemmon Survey ||  || align=right | 1.2 km || 
|-id=884 bgcolor=#E9E9E9
| 588884 ||  || — || October 25, 2008 || Kitt Peak || Spacewatch ||  || align=right | 1.3 km || 
|-id=885 bgcolor=#E9E9E9
| 588885 ||  || — || October 28, 2008 || Kitt Peak || Spacewatch ||  || align=right | 1.6 km || 
|-id=886 bgcolor=#E9E9E9
| 588886 ||  || — || October 28, 2008 || Mount Lemmon || Mount Lemmon Survey ||  || align=right | 1.5 km || 
|-id=887 bgcolor=#E9E9E9
| 588887 ||  || — || October 29, 2008 || Kitt Peak || Spacewatch ||  || align=right | 1.2 km || 
|-id=888 bgcolor=#E9E9E9
| 588888 ||  || — || November 1, 2008 || Mount Lemmon || Mount Lemmon Survey ||  || align=right | 1.7 km || 
|-id=889 bgcolor=#E9E9E9
| 588889 ||  || — || September 24, 2008 || Mount Lemmon || Mount Lemmon Survey ||  || align=right | 1.0 km || 
|-id=890 bgcolor=#E9E9E9
| 588890 ||  || — || November 2, 2008 || Kitt Peak || Spacewatch ||  || align=right | 1.7 km || 
|-id=891 bgcolor=#E9E9E9
| 588891 ||  || — || November 2, 2008 || Kitt Peak || Spacewatch ||  || align=right data-sort-value="0.76" | 760 m || 
|-id=892 bgcolor=#E9E9E9
| 588892 ||  || — || November 2, 2008 || Kitt Peak || Spacewatch ||  || align=right | 1.9 km || 
|-id=893 bgcolor=#E9E9E9
| 588893 ||  || — || November 2, 2008 || Kitt Peak || Spacewatch ||  || align=right | 1.8 km || 
|-id=894 bgcolor=#E9E9E9
| 588894 ||  || — || November 2, 2008 || Mount Lemmon || Mount Lemmon Survey ||  || align=right | 2.0 km || 
|-id=895 bgcolor=#E9E9E9
| 588895 ||  || — || September 20, 2003 || Kitt Peak || Spacewatch ||  || align=right | 1.3 km || 
|-id=896 bgcolor=#E9E9E9
| 588896 ||  || — || November 3, 2008 || Mount Lemmon || Mount Lemmon Survey ||  || align=right data-sort-value="0.99" | 990 m || 
|-id=897 bgcolor=#d6d6d6
| 588897 ||  || — || November 2, 2008 || Mount Lemmon || Mount Lemmon Survey ||  || align=right | 3.3 km || 
|-id=898 bgcolor=#E9E9E9
| 588898 ||  || — || November 2, 2008 || Mount Lemmon || Mount Lemmon Survey ||  || align=right data-sort-value="0.73" | 730 m || 
|-id=899 bgcolor=#E9E9E9
| 588899 ||  || — || November 20, 2003 || Palomar || NEAT ||  || align=right | 2.3 km || 
|-id=900 bgcolor=#E9E9E9
| 588900 ||  || — || August 26, 2012 || Haleakala || Pan-STARRS ||  || align=right | 1.4 km || 
|}

588901–589000 

|-bgcolor=#E9E9E9
| 588901 ||  || — || February 14, 2010 || Mount Lemmon || Mount Lemmon Survey ||  || align=right | 1.8 km || 
|-id=902 bgcolor=#E9E9E9
| 588902 ||  || — || March 21, 2015 || Haleakala || Pan-STARRS ||  || align=right | 1.9 km || 
|-id=903 bgcolor=#E9E9E9
| 588903 ||  || — || November 1, 2008 || Mount Lemmon || Mount Lemmon Survey ||  || align=right | 1.8 km || 
|-id=904 bgcolor=#E9E9E9
| 588904 ||  || — || January 28, 2015 || Haleakala || Pan-STARRS ||  || align=right | 1.7 km || 
|-id=905 bgcolor=#E9E9E9
| 588905 ||  || — || July 7, 2016 || SONEAR || SONEAR Obs. ||  || align=right | 1.4 km || 
|-id=906 bgcolor=#E9E9E9
| 588906 ||  || — || November 28, 2013 || Mount Lemmon || Mount Lemmon Survey ||  || align=right | 1.7 km || 
|-id=907 bgcolor=#E9E9E9
| 588907 ||  || — || August 24, 2012 || Kitt Peak || Spacewatch ||  || align=right | 2.1 km || 
|-id=908 bgcolor=#fefefe
| 588908 ||  || — || August 20, 2001 || Cerro Tololo || Cerro Tololo Obs. ||  || align=right data-sort-value="0.64" | 640 m || 
|-id=909 bgcolor=#E9E9E9
| 588909 ||  || — || September 27, 2008 || Mount Lemmon || Mount Lemmon Survey ||  || align=right | 1.6 km || 
|-id=910 bgcolor=#E9E9E9
| 588910 ||  || — || November 1, 2008 || Mount Lemmon || Mount Lemmon Survey ||  || align=right | 1.6 km || 
|-id=911 bgcolor=#E9E9E9
| 588911 ||  || — || November 2, 2008 || Mount Lemmon || Mount Lemmon Survey ||  || align=right | 1.0 km || 
|-id=912 bgcolor=#E9E9E9
| 588912 ||  || — || November 7, 2008 || Mount Lemmon || Mount Lemmon Survey ||  || align=right | 1.5 km || 
|-id=913 bgcolor=#E9E9E9
| 588913 ||  || — || April 19, 2006 || Kitt Peak || Spacewatch ||  || align=right | 2.2 km || 
|-id=914 bgcolor=#fefefe
| 588914 ||  || — || November 17, 2008 || Kitt Peak || Spacewatch ||  || align=right data-sort-value="0.60" | 600 m || 
|-id=915 bgcolor=#d6d6d6
| 588915 ||  || — || February 24, 2006 || Kitt Peak || Spacewatch ||  || align=right | 3.1 km || 
|-id=916 bgcolor=#E9E9E9
| 588916 ||  || — || May 2, 2006 || Kitt Peak || Spacewatch ||  || align=right | 1.5 km || 
|-id=917 bgcolor=#E9E9E9
| 588917 ||  || — || September 21, 2008 || Kitt Peak || Spacewatch ||  || align=right | 1.2 km || 
|-id=918 bgcolor=#E9E9E9
| 588918 ||  || — || May 5, 2006 || Kitt Peak || Spacewatch ||  || align=right | 1.8 km || 
|-id=919 bgcolor=#fefefe
| 588919 ||  || — || November 17, 2008 || Kitt Peak || Spacewatch ||  || align=right data-sort-value="0.66" | 660 m || 
|-id=920 bgcolor=#d6d6d6
| 588920 ||  || — || November 20, 2008 || Kitt Peak || Spacewatch ||  || align=right | 2.4 km || 
|-id=921 bgcolor=#E9E9E9
| 588921 ||  || — || November 20, 2008 || Kitt Peak || Spacewatch ||  || align=right | 1.9 km || 
|-id=922 bgcolor=#fefefe
| 588922 ||  || — || November 21, 2008 || Mount Lemmon || Mount Lemmon Survey ||  || align=right data-sort-value="0.63" | 630 m || 
|-id=923 bgcolor=#E9E9E9
| 588923 ||  || — || February 16, 2015 || Haleakala || Pan-STARRS ||  || align=right | 1.7 km || 
|-id=924 bgcolor=#E9E9E9
| 588924 ||  || — || May 25, 2015 || Haleakala || Pan-STARRS 2 ||  || align=right | 1.8 km || 
|-id=925 bgcolor=#E9E9E9
| 588925 ||  || — || September 18, 2012 || Mount Lemmon || Mount Lemmon Survey ||  || align=right | 1.6 km || 
|-id=926 bgcolor=#E9E9E9
| 588926 ||  || — || November 19, 2008 || Mount Lemmon || Mount Lemmon Survey ||  || align=right | 1.7 km || 
|-id=927 bgcolor=#fefefe
| 588927 ||  || — || November 21, 2008 || Mount Lemmon || Mount Lemmon Survey ||  || align=right data-sort-value="0.54" | 540 m || 
|-id=928 bgcolor=#fefefe
| 588928 ||  || — || November 20, 2008 || Kitt Peak || Spacewatch ||  || align=right data-sort-value="0.52" | 520 m || 
|-id=929 bgcolor=#E9E9E9
| 588929 ||  || — || December 2, 2008 || Mount Lemmon || Mount Lemmon Survey ||  || align=right data-sort-value="0.72" | 720 m || 
|-id=930 bgcolor=#E9E9E9
| 588930 ||  || — || November 3, 2008 || Mount Lemmon || Mount Lemmon Survey ||  || align=right | 1.4 km || 
|-id=931 bgcolor=#E9E9E9
| 588931 ||  || — || November 20, 2008 || Kitt Peak || Spacewatch ||  || align=right | 1.3 km || 
|-id=932 bgcolor=#E9E9E9
| 588932 ||  || — || September 10, 2007 || Mount Lemmon || Mount Lemmon Survey ||  || align=right | 2.3 km || 
|-id=933 bgcolor=#E9E9E9
| 588933 ||  || — || December 4, 2008 || Mount Lemmon || Mount Lemmon Survey ||  || align=right | 1.3 km || 
|-id=934 bgcolor=#E9E9E9
| 588934 ||  || — || October 29, 2003 || Kitt Peak || I. dell'Antonio, D. Wittman ||  || align=right | 1.7 km || 
|-id=935 bgcolor=#E9E9E9
| 588935 ||  || — || October 29, 2008 || Kitt Peak || Spacewatch ||  || align=right | 1.7 km || 
|-id=936 bgcolor=#E9E9E9
| 588936 ||  || — || December 2, 2008 || Kitt Peak || Spacewatch ||  || align=right | 2.4 km || 
|-id=937 bgcolor=#E9E9E9
| 588937 ||  || — || December 3, 2008 || Mount Lemmon || Mount Lemmon Survey ||  || align=right | 2.4 km || 
|-id=938 bgcolor=#E9E9E9
| 588938 ||  || — || November 24, 2008 || Kitt Peak || Spacewatch ||  || align=right | 2.8 km || 
|-id=939 bgcolor=#E9E9E9
| 588939 ||  || — || December 1, 2008 || Mount Lemmon || Mount Lemmon Survey ||  || align=right | 1.7 km || 
|-id=940 bgcolor=#E9E9E9
| 588940 ||  || — || December 3, 2008 || Mount Lemmon || Mount Lemmon Survey ||  || align=right | 2.0 km || 
|-id=941 bgcolor=#E9E9E9
| 588941 ||  || — || September 17, 2012 || Mount Lemmon || Mount Lemmon Survey ||  || align=right | 1.8 km || 
|-id=942 bgcolor=#fefefe
| 588942 ||  || — || December 8, 2008 || Mount Lemmon || Mount Lemmon Survey ||  || align=right data-sort-value="0.46" | 460 m || 
|-id=943 bgcolor=#d6d6d6
| 588943 ||  || — || January 1, 2014 || Kitt Peak || Spacewatch ||  || align=right | 1.7 km || 
|-id=944 bgcolor=#fefefe
| 588944 ||  || — || December 3, 2008 || Mount Lemmon || Mount Lemmon Survey ||  || align=right data-sort-value="0.52" | 520 m || 
|-id=945 bgcolor=#E9E9E9
| 588945 ||  || — || December 7, 2008 || Mount Lemmon || Mount Lemmon Survey ||  || align=right | 1.6 km || 
|-id=946 bgcolor=#fefefe
| 588946 ||  || — || December 22, 2008 || Calar Alto || F. Hormuth ||  || align=right data-sort-value="0.67" | 670 m || 
|-id=947 bgcolor=#E9E9E9
| 588947 ||  || — || November 30, 2008 || Kitt Peak || Spacewatch ||  || align=right | 1.6 km || 
|-id=948 bgcolor=#fefefe
| 588948 ||  || — || December 21, 2008 || Mount Lemmon || Mount Lemmon Survey ||  || align=right data-sort-value="0.53" | 530 m || 
|-id=949 bgcolor=#d6d6d6
| 588949 ||  || — || December 19, 2003 || Kitt Peak || Spacewatch ||  || align=right | 2.4 km || 
|-id=950 bgcolor=#E9E9E9
| 588950 ||  || — || May 24, 2003 || Kitt Peak || Spacewatch ||  || align=right | 1.1 km || 
|-id=951 bgcolor=#E9E9E9
| 588951 ||  || — || December 20, 2008 || Lulin || LUSS ||  || align=right | 1.3 km || 
|-id=952 bgcolor=#E9E9E9
| 588952 ||  || — || August 16, 2002 || Kitt Peak || Spacewatch ||  || align=right | 1.9 km || 
|-id=953 bgcolor=#E9E9E9
| 588953 ||  || — || November 19, 2008 || Mount Lemmon || Mount Lemmon Survey ||  || align=right | 1.6 km || 
|-id=954 bgcolor=#E9E9E9
| 588954 ||  || — || December 1, 2008 || Kitt Peak || Spacewatch ||  || align=right | 1.3 km || 
|-id=955 bgcolor=#d6d6d6
| 588955 ||  || — || October 8, 2007 || Mount Lemmon || Mount Lemmon Survey ||  || align=right | 1.8 km || 
|-id=956 bgcolor=#fefefe
| 588956 ||  || — || December 30, 2008 || Mount Lemmon || Mount Lemmon Survey ||  || align=right data-sort-value="0.67" | 670 m || 
|-id=957 bgcolor=#E9E9E9
| 588957 ||  || — || December 29, 2008 || Mount Lemmon || Mount Lemmon Survey ||  || align=right | 1.7 km || 
|-id=958 bgcolor=#d6d6d6
| 588958 ||  || — || December 29, 2008 || Mount Lemmon || Mount Lemmon Survey ||  || align=right | 1.9 km || 
|-id=959 bgcolor=#d6d6d6
| 588959 ||  || — || December 30, 2008 || Mount Lemmon || Mount Lemmon Survey ||  || align=right | 2.0 km || 
|-id=960 bgcolor=#E9E9E9
| 588960 ||  || — || December 30, 2008 || Mount Lemmon || Mount Lemmon Survey ||  || align=right | 1.4 km || 
|-id=961 bgcolor=#fefefe
| 588961 ||  || — || December 31, 2008 || Kitt Peak || Spacewatch ||  || align=right data-sort-value="0.64" | 640 m || 
|-id=962 bgcolor=#E9E9E9
| 588962 ||  || — || December 5, 2008 || Kitt Peak || Spacewatch ||  || align=right | 1.8 km || 
|-id=963 bgcolor=#E9E9E9
| 588963 ||  || — || December 29, 2008 || Kitt Peak || Spacewatch ||  || align=right | 2.2 km || 
|-id=964 bgcolor=#fefefe
| 588964 ||  || — || March 5, 2002 || Apache Point || SDSS Collaboration ||  || align=right data-sort-value="0.58" | 580 m || 
|-id=965 bgcolor=#fefefe
| 588965 ||  || — || December 29, 2008 || Kitt Peak || Spacewatch ||  || align=right data-sort-value="0.49" | 490 m || 
|-id=966 bgcolor=#E9E9E9
| 588966 ||  || — || December 21, 2008 || Mount Lemmon || Mount Lemmon Survey ||  || align=right | 2.1 km || 
|-id=967 bgcolor=#fefefe
| 588967 ||  || — || December 31, 2008 || Kitt Peak || Spacewatch ||  || align=right data-sort-value="0.63" | 630 m || 
|-id=968 bgcolor=#E9E9E9
| 588968 ||  || — || October 1, 2003 || Kitt Peak || Spacewatch ||  || align=right | 1.5 km || 
|-id=969 bgcolor=#fefefe
| 588969 ||  || — || December 31, 2008 || Mount Lemmon || Mount Lemmon Survey || H || align=right data-sort-value="0.66" | 660 m || 
|-id=970 bgcolor=#E9E9E9
| 588970 ||  || — || December 4, 2008 || Kitt Peak || Spacewatch ||  || align=right | 1.2 km || 
|-id=971 bgcolor=#E9E9E9
| 588971 ||  || — || October 21, 2003 || Palomar || NEAT ||  || align=right | 1.8 km || 
|-id=972 bgcolor=#E9E9E9
| 588972 ||  || — || December 4, 2008 || Mount Lemmon || Mount Lemmon Survey ||  || align=right | 1.6 km || 
|-id=973 bgcolor=#E9E9E9
| 588973 ||  || — || December 30, 2008 || Kitt Peak || Spacewatch ||  || align=right | 1.5 km || 
|-id=974 bgcolor=#E9E9E9
| 588974 ||  || — || December 30, 2008 || Mount Lemmon || Mount Lemmon Survey ||  || align=right | 1.8 km || 
|-id=975 bgcolor=#E9E9E9
| 588975 ||  || — || September 9, 2007 || Kitt Peak || Spacewatch ||  || align=right | 1.6 km || 
|-id=976 bgcolor=#E9E9E9
| 588976 ||  || — || December 21, 2008 || Mount Lemmon || Mount Lemmon Survey ||  || align=right | 1.9 km || 
|-id=977 bgcolor=#fefefe
| 588977 ||  || — || December 30, 2008 || Catalina || CSS || H || align=right data-sort-value="0.69" | 690 m || 
|-id=978 bgcolor=#fefefe
| 588978 ||  || — || December 30, 2008 || Mount Lemmon || Mount Lemmon Survey ||  || align=right data-sort-value="0.59" | 590 m || 
|-id=979 bgcolor=#E9E9E9
| 588979 ||  || — || December 31, 2008 || Mount Lemmon || Mount Lemmon Survey ||  || align=right | 2.0 km || 
|-id=980 bgcolor=#E9E9E9
| 588980 ||  || — || October 8, 2012 || Haleakala || Pan-STARRS ||  || align=right | 1.6 km || 
|-id=981 bgcolor=#fefefe
| 588981 ||  || — || October 3, 2011 || XuYi || PMO NEO ||  || align=right data-sort-value="0.54" | 540 m || 
|-id=982 bgcolor=#fefefe
| 588982 ||  || — || December 21, 2008 || Kitt Peak || Spacewatch ||  || align=right data-sort-value="0.47" | 470 m || 
|-id=983 bgcolor=#E9E9E9
| 588983 ||  || — || March 12, 2014 || Mount Lemmon || Mount Lemmon Survey ||  || align=right data-sort-value="0.94" | 940 m || 
|-id=984 bgcolor=#E9E9E9
| 588984 ||  || — || December 22, 2008 || Mount Lemmon || Mount Lemmon Survey ||  || align=right | 1.9 km || 
|-id=985 bgcolor=#E9E9E9
| 588985 ||  || — || December 1, 2003 || Kitt Peak || Spacewatch ||  || align=right | 1.6 km || 
|-id=986 bgcolor=#E9E9E9
| 588986 ||  || — || December 29, 2008 || Kitt Peak || Spacewatch ||  || align=right | 1.4 km || 
|-id=987 bgcolor=#d6d6d6
| 588987 ||  || — || October 10, 2007 || Mount Lemmon || Mount Lemmon Survey ||  || align=right | 1.9 km || 
|-id=988 bgcolor=#fefefe
| 588988 ||  || — || January 1, 2009 || Kitt Peak || Spacewatch ||  || align=right data-sort-value="0.55" | 550 m || 
|-id=989 bgcolor=#E9E9E9
| 588989 ||  || — || January 2, 2009 || Kitt Peak || Spacewatch ||  || align=right | 1.3 km || 
|-id=990 bgcolor=#E9E9E9
| 588990 ||  || — || January 2, 2009 || Mount Lemmon || Mount Lemmon Survey ||  || align=right | 1.9 km || 
|-id=991 bgcolor=#d6d6d6
| 588991 ||  || — || September 13, 2007 || Mount Lemmon || Mount Lemmon Survey ||  || align=right | 1.9 km || 
|-id=992 bgcolor=#E9E9E9
| 588992 ||  || — || January 2, 2009 || Mount Lemmon || Mount Lemmon Survey ||  || align=right | 2.2 km || 
|-id=993 bgcolor=#E9E9E9
| 588993 ||  || — || November 26, 2003 || Kitt Peak || Spacewatch ||  || align=right | 1.6 km || 
|-id=994 bgcolor=#d6d6d6
| 588994 ||  || — || September 14, 2002 || Kitt Peak || Spacewatch ||  || align=right | 1.8 km || 
|-id=995 bgcolor=#d6d6d6
| 588995 ||  || — || January 2, 2009 || Kitt Peak || Spacewatch ||  || align=right | 1.8 km || 
|-id=996 bgcolor=#E9E9E9
| 588996 ||  || — || December 21, 2008 || Kitt Peak || Spacewatch ||  || align=right | 2.8 km || 
|-id=997 bgcolor=#E9E9E9
| 588997 ||  || — || October 14, 2007 || Mount Lemmon || Mount Lemmon Survey ||  || align=right | 2.3 km || 
|-id=998 bgcolor=#d6d6d6
| 588998 ||  || — || April 11, 2005 || Kitt Peak || Spacewatch ||  || align=right | 1.8 km || 
|-id=999 bgcolor=#fefefe
| 588999 ||  || — || January 15, 2009 || Kitt Peak || Spacewatch ||  || align=right data-sort-value="0.92" | 920 m || 
|-id=000 bgcolor=#fefefe
| 589000 ||  || — || August 28, 2014 || Haleakala || Pan-STARRS ||  || align=right data-sort-value="0.71" | 710 m || 
|}

References

External links 
 Discovery Circumstances: Numbered Minor Planets (585001)–(590000) (IAU Minor Planet Center)

0588